= Ali bin Abdurrahman al-Habsyi =

Founder of Majelis Taklim Kwitang, Islamic Center Indonesia

Habib Ali bin Abdurrahman al-Habshi
- علي بن عبد الرحمن الحبشي
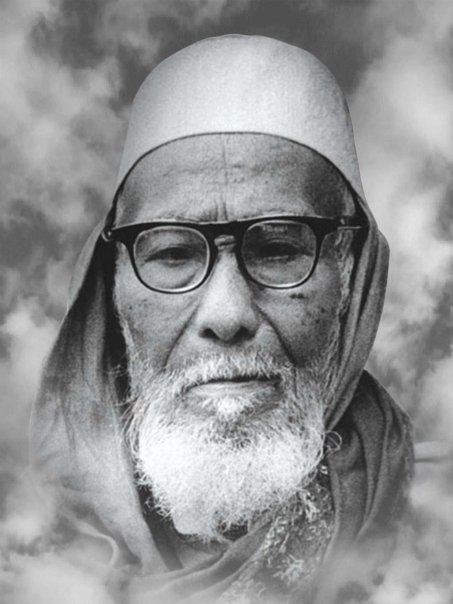
- Habib Ali
- Born: Ali; April 20, 1870; Kwitang, Senen, Batavia, Dutch East Indies
- Died: October 13, 1968 (aged 98); Jakarta, Indonesia
- Resting place: Kwitang, Jakarta -6.182595, 106.841861
- Other name: Habib Ali al-Habshi
- Education: Rubath Tarim, Mecca, Medina
- Occupations: Islamic scholar, teacher
- Years active: 1920–1968
- Organization: Islamic Center Indonesia
- Known for: Founder of Islamic Center Indonesia (ICI)
- Title: Habib
- Successor: Muhammad bin Ali al-Habshi
- Spouse: Aishah Assegaf
- Children: 10

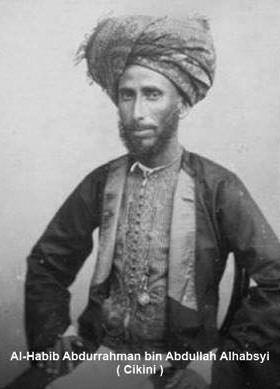
Habib Abdurahman bin Abdullah Al-Habsyi, father of Habib Ali Kwitang

Ali bin Abdurrahman al-Habshi, better known as Habib Ali of Kwitang or Habib Ali Kwitang (Arabic: علي بن عبدالرحمن الحبشي, Arabic pronunciation: [ʕali: bin ʕbdul rahman al ħabʃiy]; April 20, 1870 – October 13, 1968), was one of the leading Islamic clerics and preachers in Jakarta in the 20th century. He was also the founder and chairman of the Majelis Taklim Kwitang (the Islamic congregation of Kwitang; although Majelis Taklim itself literally means Board of Education) and Islamic Center Indonesia, which are the forerunners of other religious organizations in Jakarta.

== History ==
Ali was born in the area of Kwitang in Central Jakarta on April 20, 1870, CE which was 20 Jumada al-Awwal 1286 AH. His father was Abdurrahman bin Abdullah bin Muhammad al-Habshi, an Arab Indonesian of Hadhrami- Sayyid descent. His father better known as Habib Cikini (d. 1879 CE) was born in Petak Sembilan, Semarang and was an Islamic scholar and preacher who lived in asceticism. His father died in 1879 CE when Ali was young and was buried in Cikini. His mother (born in Meester Cornelis) was a pious woman named Salmah (Nyai Salmeh), a daughter of a Betawi cleric from Kampung Melayu, East Jakarta. His father once married to Syarifah Rogayah bint Husen bin Alwi bin Awal bin Yahya, the younger sister of Raden Saleh, but from this marriage they did not have any offspring. Besides Ali, Abdurrahman had another son named Abdul Qadir, the younger brother of Ali who married to Sidah, the daughter of Habib Usman bin Yahya. Only from Ali the lineage of Abdurrahman continued as Abdul Qadir had only three daughters (the Arab society is patrilineal). Among students of Habib Abdurahman was Habib Ahmad Bin alwi al-Haddad, known as Habib Kuncung, who is buried in Kalibata, which is known for his piety and sanctity.

His grandfather was Habib Abdullah bin Muhammad al-Habshi was born in Pontianak, West Kalimantan. He married a Semarang girl and had a son named Abdurrahman, and later in Pontianak he married another girl of Bansir family and had a son named Ali, who later moved to Gorontalo, settled and built a family there. Abdullah died on his sailing back to Pontianak, where the ship sunk in Java sea near Sukadana in 1833 CE (1249 AH). According to some sources, the ship sunk while fighting against "Lanun", a term used by people in Pontianak for pirates. Habib Ali Kwitang's great-grandfather, Muhammad al-Habshi was a wulayti, came from Hadhramaut and lived in Pontianak but died in Taribah, Hadhramaut. He married the princess of Pontianak Sultanate of Algadri clan from the dynasty of al-Qadiriyyah al-Hashimiyyah.

Ali was a Sayyid and his lineage traces back to Imam Ali as recorded as follows: Ali bin Abdurrahman bin Abdullah bin Muhammad bin Husein bin Abdurrahman bin Husein bin Abdurrahman bin Hadi bin Ahmad Shahib Syi'ib bin Muhammad al-Ashghar bin Alwi bin Abubakar al-Habshi bin Ali bin Ahmad bin Muhammad Assadilah bin Hasan al-Turabi bin Ali bin Muhammad al-Faqih Muqaddam bin Ali ibn Muhammad Shahib Mirbath bin Ali Khali' Qasam bin Alwi al-Tsani bin Muhammad bin Alwi al-Awwal bin Ubaidillah bin Ahmad al-Muhajir ibn Isa al-Rumi ibn Muhammad al-Naqib bin 'Ali al-Uraidhi ibn Ja'far al-Sadiq bin Muhammad al-Baqir ibn Zayn al-‘Ābdīn ibn Husain ibn Ali bin Abu Talib and Fatimah daughter of Muhammad.

=== Early life ===
Abdurahman asked his wife, Nyi Salmah, to ensure that his son, Ali, was schooled in Hadhramaut and Mecca as It was common for Betawi people to send their children to the Middle East for religious education.

When Ali reached about 11 years old, he went to Hadhramaut to study Islam from 1881 CE to 1886 CE. The first place he went was rubath Habib 'Abdur Rahman ibn' Alwi al-'Aydrus. There he learned from the scholars, among others, Habib 'Ali ibn Muhammad al-Habshi (the author of Mawlid book Shimthud Durar), Habib Hasan bin Ahmad al-'Aydrus, Habib Zain bin 'Alwi Ba'Abud, Habib Ahmad bin Hasan al-'Aththas and Shaikh Hasan bin 'Awadh. He also had the opportunity to study in al-Haramain (the Land of the Two Holy Mosques) during 1887-1889 and studied under Habib Muhammad bin Husain al-Habshi (Mufti of Mecca), Sayyid Abu Bakr al-Bakri Syatha al-Dimyati, Shaikh Muhammad Said Babsail, and Shaikh 'Umar Hamda.

His passion to study never stopped, even after his return to Indonesia in 1889. He studied with a number of prominent scholars in Jakarta, including Habib Usman bin Yahya the mufti of Batavia, the marabout Habib Abdullah bin Muhsin Alatas in Empang, Bogor (his favorite teacher in Indonesia), and Habib Muhammad bin Ahmad al-Muhdhar of Bondowoso.

=== Later life ===
At the age of 20 years, Habib Ali Kwitang married to Syarifah Aisha binti Ali Assegaf, a girl from Gedong Hijau, South Jakarta. From the marriage, Habib Ali had eight daughters (Rogayah, Fatimah, Khadijah, Maryam, Mahani, Zainab, Zahra, and Sa’diyah) and two sons (Abdurrahman and Muhammad). His first child, Abdurahman, whom used to be called Wan Derahman, married a catholic woman of Dutch descent named Maria Van Engels (people later called her Wan Enon or Jidah Non, while her families call her Nonni) who then converted to Islam and changed her name to Mariam. Abdurrahman had a short life and died in 1940 long before his father died. Abdurahman was buried initially at Said Naum Cemetery in Tanah Abang, but later moved to Karet Cemetery. Children of the couple Abdurrahman and Mariam, among others, were Muhdhar (nickname: Adong) and Salmah (nickname: Dameh). Salmah or better known as Bu Dame' or mother Dame' (d. 2000) was the only one of granddaughters of Habib Ali who continued the dawah to women congregation in Kwitang.

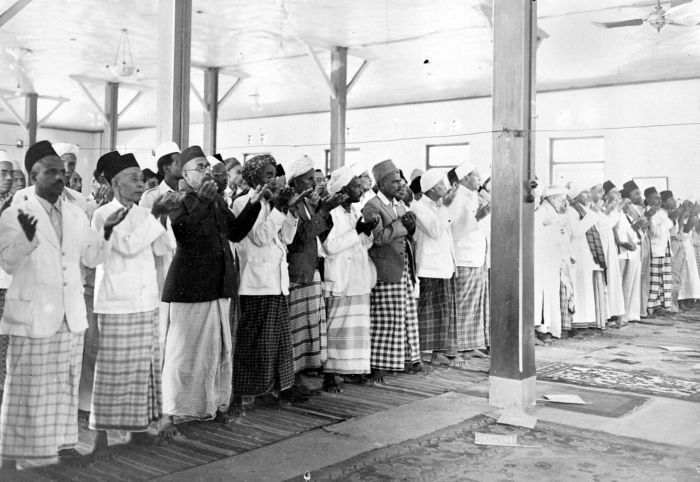
Salat al-Gayb at Kwitang mosque in Jakarta led by Habib Ali, following the death of Muhammad Ali Jinnah, the first Governor-General of Pakistan, September 14, 1948

In addition to preaching at a number of places, he also traded for living. While carrying his merchandises on horseback, Habib Ali began trading in Tanah Abang Market in 1900. Although he was busy trading, Habib Ali always kept his prayer times, which was then followed by many Muslim merchants at Tanah Abang market. Every day approximately 10 minutes before Dhuhr time, Ali closed his stall and carried most of his merchandise, followed by other traders. After midday Habib Ali no longer open his stall, but did trade while preaching to the planned destination of each days. Such condition followed by other traders, in such that the Tanah Abang market at the time was then called Tanah Abang Morning Market (because it open only in the morning). He did this until he reached 70 years old.

Habib Ali was involved in the establishment of Jamiat Kheir in 1901 and Rabithah al-Alawiyah in 1928. Although he was not an active member of Jamiar Kheir, he gave spiritual support for the establishment. In 1928, Habib Ali held his first mawlid in front of Al Ma'mur Masjid or in the field of Jamiat Kheir Foundation in Tanah Abang, but later was held in Kwitang.

Ali went for Hajj three times. First in 1311 AH or 1894 CE when Mecca was ruled by Aun Al-Rafiq Pasha, the second was in 1343 AH or 1925 CE when Hejaz was ruled by King Ali bin Hussein, and the third one was in 1354 AH or 1936 CE when the Hejaz was ruled by King Abdulaziz bin Abdul Rahman Al Saud.

In the beginning of 1958 Habib Ali fell in the bathroom which resulted severe joints injury. His family refused Ali to get a surgery, because he was already more than 90 years old, so he just got regular treatment. He became partially paralyzed and almost always on wheelchair.

In the last few years of his life Habib Ali spent his time reading the Koran at his veranda in Kwitang. Habib Ali even made his residence as a mosque named Awwabin and used it for Maghrib, Isha, and Fajr prayers in congregation with a number of his disciples.

=== Death ===
Habib Ali died Sunday on October 13, 1968, at 20:45 pm at the age of 98 years or around 103 years by Hijri calendar. His death received tremendous attention from his disciples and also Muslim communities in the country. The news of his death was even broadcast by a number of television and radio stations from Arab countries as well as Voice of America's broadcasting station to various countries. The only Indonesian TV broadcasting station at that time, TVRI, broadcast the news live about his death as well. When the news of his death spread out, thousands of people mourned and paid respects at the funeral home.

Habib Ali Kwitang could be the only servant of God in Indonesia whose body was bathed with the Zam Zam water. On the day of his funeral, the Indonesian government decided to make the day of funeral as National day of mourning and expected people to install flag at half-mast in honor of his services to the nation and state. At the time when the body was going to be moved from the house to the cemetery, it could not be moved due to the large number of mourners filled the Kramat II street to the Arriyadh Mosque. The body was then carried passing over the heads of thousands of mourners and it took about half an hour to arrive, even though the distance to the burial was only approximately 200 meters (660 ft) from the residence of Habib Ali. Habib Salim bin Jindan appointed and initiated a Bay'ah to Ali's son Muhammad to continue his father's work. Since the death of Muhammad on December 12, 1993, the leadership of ICI is continued by Muhammad's son, Abdurrahman al-Habshi.

The death of Habib Ali Kwitang according to Hamka was very big loss for the nation, because Habib Ali's struggle for preaching had made many people in Jakarta became better Muslims. Hamka also acknowledged that Habib Ali was the descendant of Muhammad the prophet of Islam and played very important role in the struggle of Indonesian people, so he should deservedly get a high respect.

== Career ==
During Dutch East Indies ruling, there was a rebellion against the government in Priangan area. The Dutch government sought help to Habib Ali Kwitang to mediate a ceasefire with the Priangan Muslims in the region. Fortunately Habib Ali Kwitang successfully mollified the Priangan people, so they would stop the war. This incident pleased the Dutch Colonial, so it gave the Medal of Honor to Ali for his contribution to reconcile the dispute.

In addition to tasuwir (the betawi term for a Sermon at the time), he also authored a number of books, such as al-Azhar Al-Wardiyyah fi al-Shuurah An-Nabawiyyah (The character of the Prophet) and al-Durar Fi al-Shalawat al-Khair al-Bariyyah (book about shalawat). He also used yellow books (a term for classic religious books; usually printed in yellow paper) written by Abdullah ibn Alawi al-Haddad, a scholar living in Hadramaut about 300 years ago who wrote the famous Ratib Haddad.

There was already a mosque in Kwitang in 1910 called al-Riyadh Musholla. In order to strengthen the preaching task, in 1918 Habib Ali expanded the mosque, where next to it he later built a madrasah named Madrasah Unwanul Falah. The land used to build the mosque was a waqf partially provided by a Betawi of Kwitang, Haji Jilani (Mad Jilani) and by Sayyid Abdurrahman bin Syech AlKaff. Many scholars in Jakarta had been his students or had studied at the madrasah.

In 1911 Ali founded Majelis Taklim Kwitang (the activity of congregation in Majelis Taklim is mostly listening to sermon given by the preacher) on Kwitang II street. In relatively short time, his activity attracted many people, including from the suburbs such as Ciputat, Condet, even Depok. Because there was no city bus at that time, some of his disciples came by train, but mostly by horse-powered wagons. On April 20, 1963, he was in the committee to renovate the mosque for its third time. The committee consisted of government officials as well as Ulamas. On May 8, 1963, some newspapers in Jakarta, the Indonesian news agency Antara carried story about the Masjid Kwitang renovation with dome and minarets.

A number of other Betawi scholars who had studied to him and some even open other Majelis Taklim were Thahir Rohili (the founder of al-Thahiriyyah), Abdullah Syafi'i (the founder of Assyafi'iyyah), Fathullah Harun (later migrated to Malaysia), Abdulrazak Mamun and Zayadi. Although these people were his disciples, Habib Ali treat them like his own family. He often visited them at their home. In his Majelis Taklim, they were always given the opportunity to give a speech. Later, Habib Salim bin Jindan, who was famous for hist fiery speeches, joined him.

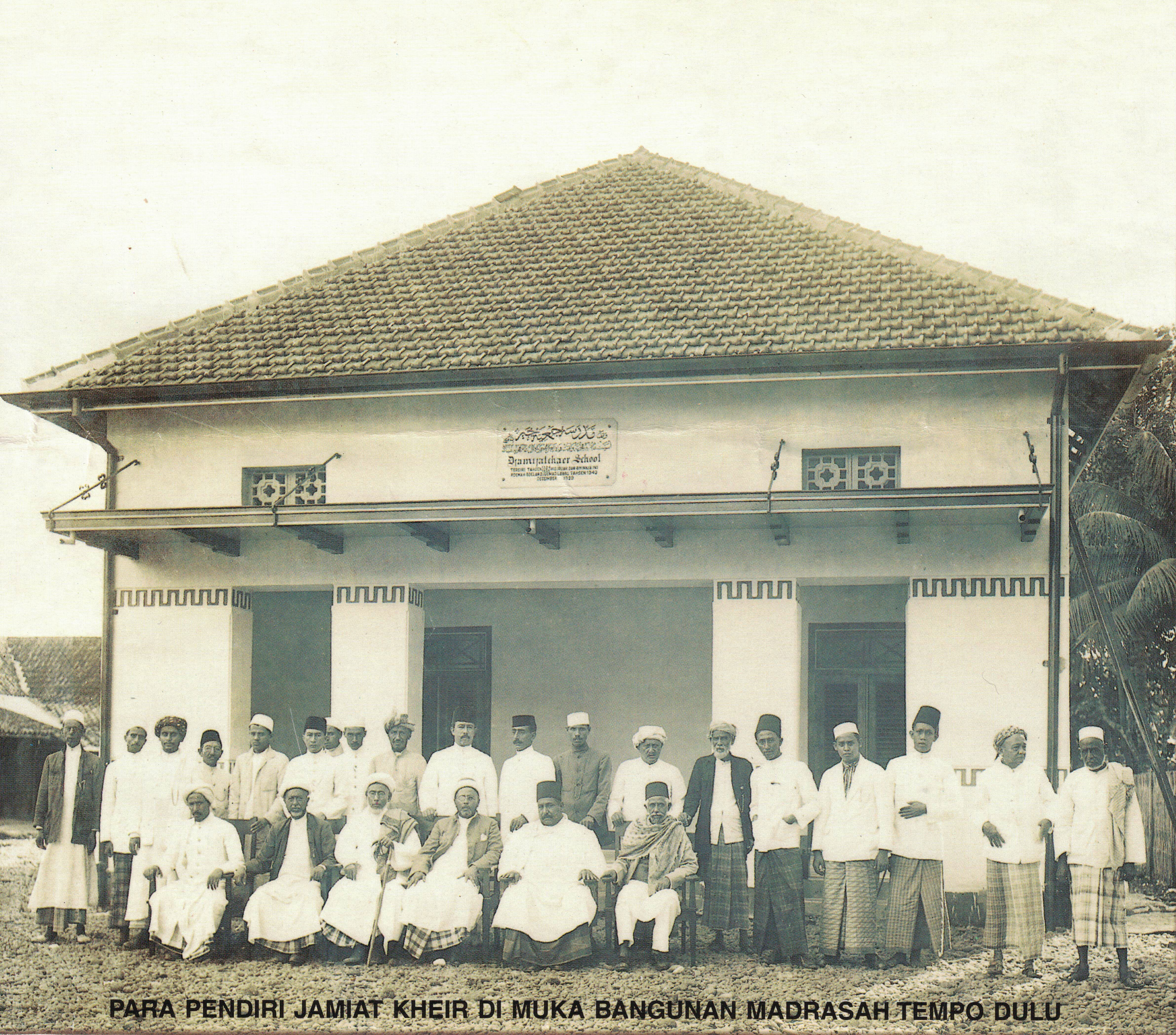
Habib Ali (front row: third from the left) with other founding members of Jamiat Kheir.

As a well-known scholar, Habib Ali preached at many places in Indonesia. He also had students from Singapore and Malaysia. In addition, he also had traveled to many countries, such as Pakistan, India, Colombo, and Egypt. Habib Ali was known not only in Southeast Asian countries (such as Malaysia, Singapore, or Thailand), but also in African and Middle East countries.

Habib Ali began to perform Mawlid every last Thursday of Rabi' al-awwal since the death of Muhammad ibn Habib Idrus Al-Habshi in 1920 CE (1338 AH) until 1937 CE (1355 AH) at Jamiat Kheir and later moved to al-Riyadh mosque. Habib Ali also played an important role in the establishment of Al-Rabithah al-Alawiyyah in 1928 and its sub-organization, al-Maktab Daimi in around 1940.

Habib Ali was respected by many Indonesian officials and also befriend with Sukarno. A few days before the Proclamation of Indonesian Independence, Habib Ali Kwitang offered his residence for Sukarno to stay overnight before proclaiming the independence to avoid threats from the Dutch Empire. During his stay at Habib Ali Kwitang's residence, Sukarno always followed spiritual activities in Habib Ali's assembly and congregation. The assembly invoked a lot of prayers for safety of Sukarno and for the independence which would be proclaimed on the August 17, 1945 CE which was also in the month of Ramadan.

In 1963, Sukarno planned to visit his congregation but due to various factors could not attend, so he instead sent the Indonesian Prime Minister at the time, Djuanda Kartawidjaja. In March 1965, during Asian-African Islamic Conference (KIAA), the heads of state and guests were ushered to Habib Ali's Majelis Taklim Kwitang by the chief of staff of the armed forces of Indonesia who was the Minister of Defence, General Abdul Haris Nasution. Leaders of the Muslim World League during their visit to Indonesia also paid a visit to Habib Ali. Similarly, Soeharto, B.J. Habibie, Abdurrahman Wahid, and Susilo Bambang Yudhoyono at least have visited the place once. Traditionally, every new elected governor of Jakarta would visit the shrine of Habib Ali.

== Legacies ==
According to Mohammad Asad bin Ali bin Ahmad Shahab who knew Habib Ali Kwitang for decades, Habib Ali's assembly could survive for more than a century as the core teachings of Islam because the materials he offered were peaceful, full of akhlaq, monotheistic, contained purity of faith, social solidarity, and noble morality.

Although traditionally Habib Ali and his future generations follow Shafi'i Madhhab for fiqh and Ba 'Alawiyya for everything else, one of his grandsons, Ali Ridha bin Muhammad, is a shiah scholar, graduated from Qom in 1974.

Habib Ali's Majlis of Mawlid is still hold annually to date in Jakarta, and is usually attended by thousands of people from many places, including foreign countries.

== Bibliography ==
- bin Muhammad al-Habsyi, Abdurrahman (2010). Prasetyo Sudrajat (ed.). Sumur yang tak pernah kering : dari Kwitang menjadi ulama besar : riwayat Habib Ali Alhabsyi Kwitang (in Indonesian). ICI. ISBN 978-6029668308.
