= Rabithah Alawiyah =

Islamic organization based in Jakarta, Indonesia

- الرابطة العلوية
- The logo of Rabithah al-Alawiyyah

- Zone of influence
- Formation: December 27, 1928 CE
- Founder: Muhammad bin Abdurrahman bin Shahab; Abubakar bin Abdullah al-Attas; Abdullah bin Ali al-Aydarus; Abubakar bin Muhammad Al-Habshi; Idrus bin Ahmad bin Shahab; Ahmad bin Abdullah al-Seggaf; Ali bin Abdurrahman al-Habshi; Alwi bin Muhammad al-Haddad; Alwi bin Thahir al-Haddad; Abdullah bin Umar al-Zahir; Abdullah bin Abubakar al-Habshi; Salim bin Ahmad Bawazir
- Type: NGO
- Legal status: Foundation
- Purpose: Social, Humanitarian, Religious activities
- Headquarters: Jakarta, Indonesia
- Location: Jalan TB. Simatupang No. 7A, Jakarta 12560
- Region served: Southeast Asia
- Members: Ba 'Alawi sada
- Official language: Indonesian
- Chairman: Taufiq Assegaf
- Subsidiaries: al-Maktab al-Daimi
- Website: Rabithah Alawiyah

Rabithah Alawiyah (Arabic: الرابطة العلوية; lit. The Association of Alawiyyin or Alawiyyin League) is an Indonesian Islamic organization engaged in social movements. In general, the organization is an exclusive association of Hadhrami people of Ba 'Alawi sada families. The organization was established on December 27, 1928, CE or 1346 AH, not long after the Soempah Pemoeda (Youth Pledge) October 28, 1928. The organization has a sub-organization called al-Maktab al-Daimi given task to collect, verify and maintain genealogies of Ba 'Alawi sada and print pedigree passes to prove the ancestry of individuals around the world.

== History ==
Although Jamiat Kheir had been granted permission and founded, The Dutch East Indies government still had concern and suspicion about its activity. Later, the Jamiat Kheir turned into a fully educational-only organization, so Arab Indonesians of Ba 'Alawi sada decided to build another organization to continue the original tasks of Jamiat Kheir, which is social engagements. It was also intended as a body to maintain and enhance the dignity of Muslims in Indonesia, particularly Alawiyyin family through social efforts and Dawah, Islamic education and moral guidance through good deeds and Islamic brotherhood in the unity of the nation and state.

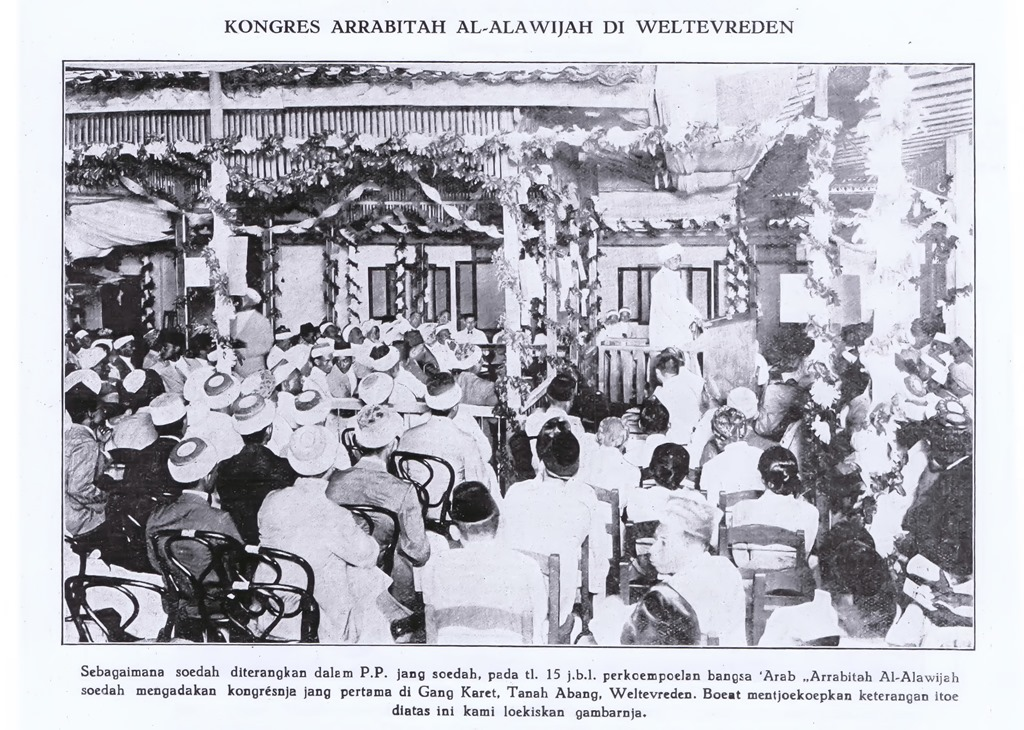

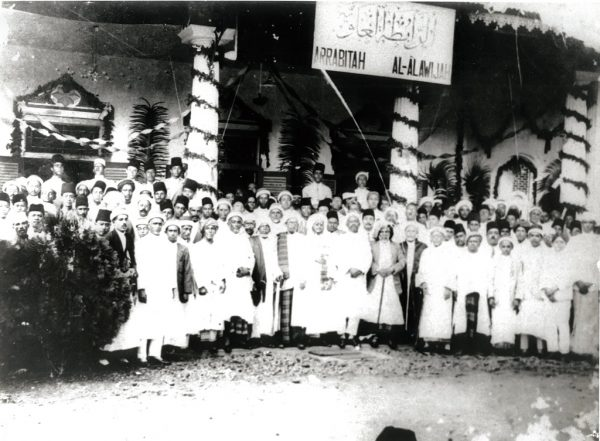

Two months after the Youth Pledge, Alawiyin figures requested a permission to the Dutch Government to establish the new association, al-Rabithatoel al-Alawijah (as it was spelled at the time) which was recorded in the notary deed number 6 by A.H. Van Ophuijsen dated January 16, 1928. The request was approved by the Dutch government on December 27, 1928, CE (1346 AH), which was signed by the Gerard Rudolph Erdbrink (Secretary of the Dutch East Indies Government; [1881-1954]) with the second permission issued on November 27, 1929.

Many of the management members of this newly created organization were also members of Jamiat Kheir. Some founders of the al-Rabithah who were also administrators of Jamiat Kheir, among others were Muhammad bin Abdurrahman bin Ali Shahab, Idrus bin Ahmad Shahab, Ali bin Ahmad Shahab (brother of Idrus), and Abubakar bin Muhammad al-habshi. The first student financed by the al-Rabithah to graduate from Jamiat Kheir was Syarifah Qamar of Daarul Aitam, where she received scholarship of 15 guilders a month.

Just a year after the establishment of the organization at the central level, in 1929 there were branches of the organization erected in Pekalongan, Semarang, Solo, Surabaya, Tuban, Gresik, Bangil, Palembang, and Bondowoso. In addition to these branches, regions which could not meet the conditions to establish branches soon then established representative offices. In the same year, had stood representative offices of al-Rabithah in Makassar, Ende, Probolinggo, Cianjur, Sukorejo, Tulungagung, Jombang, Jember, Mojosari, Lumajang, Malang, Sumenep, and Banyuwangi.

Although still at young age, al-Rabithah was able to align itself with other older organizations. In 1930, for example, al-Rabithah received an invitation to attend the Muslim Youth Conference. al-Rabithah was represented by Alwi bin Thahir al-Haddad who gave an interesting lecture which was then printed and distributed to the conference participants.

Rabithah was also active in the Islamic Conference in Surabaya and collaborated with Muhammadiyah to hold Mawlid. In line with its policy, the Rabithah was also responsive to social and contemporary issues at the time, such as fundraising and humanitarian aid for victims of the eruption of Mount Merapi (1930), famine in Palestine, and the construction of mosques and orphanages orphans in various regions.

al-Rabithah al-Alawiyyah plays important roles on national interests individually and collectively through formal education institutions, Islamic boarding schools, informal religious gatherings, assembly of Dhikr (remembrance), and through training centers spread all over the country. It also participates in educating the mature life of the nation, economic development of the people as well as instill a nationalism. Besides giving scholarships, every year the organization distributes zakat to needy people. The main source of fund for the organization is through community contributions, as well as through for-profit business.

== Founders ==
=== Jakarta Branch ===
The first board members of this association were also the founders, namely: Muhammad bin Abdurrahman bin Shihab (chairman), Abubakar bin Abdullah al-Attas (Vice Chairman I), Abdullah bin Ali al-Aydarus (Vice Chairman II), Abubakar bin Muhammad al-Habshi (Treasurer I), Idrus bin Ahmad bin Shahab (Treasurer II), Ahmad bin Abdullah al-Seggaf (Secretary), Ali bin Abdurrahman al-Habshi (Trustee), Alwi bin Muhammad al-Haddad (Trustee), Alwi bin Thohir al-Haddad (Trustee), Abdullah bin Umar al-Zahir (Trustee), Abdullah bin Abubakar al-Habshi (Trustee) and Salim bin Ahmad Bawazir (Trustee). The first chairman of this organization was Alwi bin Thahir al-Haddad.

=== Solo Branch ===
Although the first Rabithah was established in Batavia, the approval came later after the Branch in Solo was established on October 7, 1928 (1 Jumada al-awwal 1346 AH). The founders in Solo were Husein Bin Alwi Bin Shahab, Ibrahim bin Agil al-Seggaf, Muhammad bin Segaf al-Seggaf, Ali bin Salim Aidid, Eidrus bin Muhammad al-Jufri, Alwi bin Ali al-Habshi, Ali bin Muhammad al-Habshi, Hasan bin Husein al-Seggaf, Ali bin Syech bin Shahab, Salim bin Basri al-Seggaf, Muhammad bin Abdullah bin Husein al-Seggaf, Husin bin Abdurrahman al-Seggaf, Abdullah bin Abdul-Rahman bin Sumaith, Husein bin Abdullah al-Habshi, and Ahmad bin Ali bin Muhammad Makarim.

Shortly, the organization built a school called Madrasah Ibtidaiyya al-Rabithah al-Alawiyyah in Pasar Kliwon District. At first, the school engaged in Islamic Studies, Arabic language, and some limited secular subjects. For the reason of patriotism, on March 9, 1966, the school was renamed to Islamic Education Foundation of Diponegoro, where it remains in use today.

== Organization ==
The management structure of year 2011-2016 consists of an advisory board, a supervisory board, board of directors and a list of managing directors for each chapter: Venture Empowerment, Organization, Inter-Institutional Relations, Public Relations & Media, Dawah, Education and Training, and Affairs of Social Welfare. The organization has branches spread out from west to east of Indonesia.

The office was originally located in Jamiat Kheir complex in Tanah Abang, but later moved to a separate building on TB. Simatupang street in South Jakarta.

=== al-Maktab al-Daimi ===
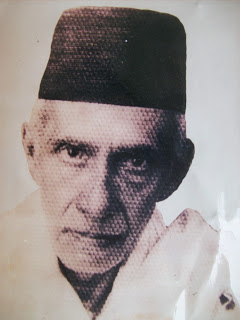
Ali bin Ja’far bin Syech Al-Seggaf

al-Maktab al-Daimi (Arabic: المكتب الدائمي, romanized: al-maktab al-dāimiy; lit. Office of Records) is an autonomous official body of Rabithah al-Alawiyyah working to preserve lineage, consanguinity, history and census data of Ba 'Alawi sada. The establishment of this institution in 1954 was during the leadership of Alwi bin Thahir al-Haddad, not long after the establishment of Rabithah al-Alawiyyah and after it had earned the unanimous agreement from the Alawiyyin figures, elders, and scholars, such Habib Alwi bin Thahir al-Haddad (Mufti of Johor), Habib Ahmad bin Abdullah al-Seggaf (author of the pedigree book Khidmah al-Asyirah) and Habib Ali bin Abdurrahman al-Habshi of Kwitang.

To perform this task, the forum appointed a son of wulayti, Sayyid Ali bin Ja'far bin Syeikh al-Seggaf (born in Palembang, 16 November 16, 1889 CE or 22 Rabi’ al-awwal 1307 AH), who was also on the supervisory board at Rabithah Alawiyyah in Batavia. With the fund of Rabithah Alawiyah and from a philanthropist named Sheikh bin Ahmad bin Shahab, he censused and recorded Sayyid families throughout Indonesia in 1928 and 1940 (another version says in 1932). Per January 28, 1940 CE (18 Dzulhijjah 1358 AH) there were 17,764 people counted as the members of Sayyid families. Ali bin Ja'far was then later elected as the first chairman and Hasyim bin Muhammad al-Hadi bin Ahmad al-Habshi as the deputy chairman, with Alwi bin Thahir al-Haddad and Ahmad bin Abdullah al-Shofie al-Seggaf as their advisors. Today this body records genealogical notes not only for Alawiyyin people of Indonesia, but also from abroad.

For references, the al-Maktab Daimi use books such as al-Shamsu al-Dzahirah by Habib Abdurrahman bin Mohammed al-Mashhoor, seven volume of the original handwritten books of Salman bin Said bin Awad Ba-Ghauts, three volumes of handwritten book Sajarah Ansaab Al-Alawiyyin (شجرة الانساب العلوين ) by Habib Ali bin Ja'far al-Seggaf, the book about Alawiyyin census report in Indonesia, and 15 volumes of The Ledger of Alawiyyin lineage books written by Habib Abdullah bin Isa ibn Hud al-Habshi which is an expansion of and is based on the three-volumes book of Ali bin Ja'far al-Seggaf, all of them are authentic, and only owned by al-Maktab al-Daimi.

=== Jamiat Kheir School ===
See Jamiat Kheir.
