= Uthman bin Yahya =

Islamic scholar and Grand Mufti of Batavia

Habib Uthman bin Yahya
- عثمان بن يحيى
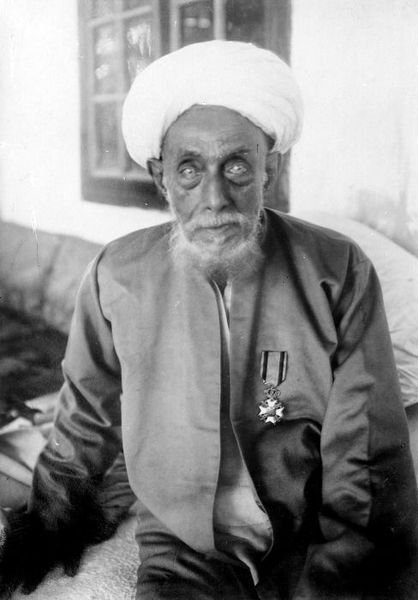
- Habib Uthman
- Born: 1822; Pekojan, Batavia, Dutch East Indies
- Died: 1913 (aged 90–91); Batavia, Dutch East Indies
- Resting place: Pondok Bambu
- Occupations: Islamic scholar, Mufti
- Employer: Dutch East Indies
- Known for: Mufti of Batavia
- Notable work: preaching
- Title: Habib
- Parent(s): Abdullah bin Aqil (father); Aminah (mother)

Uthman bin Yahya (Arabic: عثمان بن يحيى, romanized: ‘Uthmān bin Yahyā; Arabic pronunciation: [ʕuθma:n bin jɑħjɑ:] full name: (Arabic: سيد عثمان بن عبد الله بن عقيل بن يحيى العلوي, romanized: Sayyid ‘Uthmān ibn ‘Abdallāh ibn ‘Aqīl ibn Yaḥyā al-‘Alawī) 17 Rabi' al-awwal 1238 AH – 21 Safar 1331 AH; 1822 – 1913) was an Islamic scholar who served as Grand Mufti of Batavia in 19th century of Dutch East Indies.

== History ==
Habib Uthman bin Yahya was born in Pekojan, Batavia in 1822 (17 Rabi' al-awwal 1238 AH). Uthman came from the Ba 'Alawi sada family from his father, Sayyid Abdullah bin Aqil bin Umar bin Yahya. His mother was Aminah, a daughter of Shaykh Abdurrahman, who was the cousin to the scholar Abdullah al-Misri. His father, Abdullah, and his grandfather, Aqil, were born in Mecca, while his great grandfather, Umar, was born in the village of Qarah al-Shaikh in Hadhramaut, who later moved and died in Medina. Snouck Hurgronje explained that his grandfather was a respected scholar as Sheikh of Sadah for 50 years and died in Mecca in 1823 (1238 AH).

His father moved to Mecca when Uthman was 3 years old, so Uthman was taken care of by his grandfather, Aqil. His grandfather has many other sons, besides the father of Uthman. Many of his sons became scholars in Mecca, such as Sayyid Ishaq, who died in the city of Ta'if, and Sayyid Qasim who continued Agil's leadership as Shaikh of Sada in Mecca.

Uthman had a family relationship with Habib Ali Kwitang through one of his daughters named Sidah, who married Abdul Qadir, the brother of Habib Ali Kwitang.

Uthman died in 1913 (precisely on 21 Safar 1331) at more than 90 years of age. He was buried in the Karet public cemetery in Tanah Abang to fulfil his will. Later on, during relocation of the cemetery, his family moved his grave to Kelurahan Pondok Bambu, where his grave is still well preserved in the south part of the mosque of al-Abidin in Pondok Bambu, East Jakarta.

== Education ==
Uthman studied Qur'an, Tafsir and other Islamic sciences such as Akhlaq, Tawhid, Fiqh, Sufism, Nahwu Sharaf, Hadith and Astronomy under the care of his maternal grandfather, Shaykh Abdurrahman bin Ahmad Al-Mishri. After the death of his grandfather when he was 18 years old, Uthman went for hajj and met his father and relatives in Mecca. There, for seven years he studied Islamic sciences under his father and Ahmad Zayni Dahlan, the Mufti of Mecca at the time. Uthman continued his journey in the pursuit of knowledge to Hadhramaut in 1848. There, he studied under Habib Abdullah bin Umar and his maternal uncle Habib Husein bin Abdullah (later on, one of his teacher's grandson, Sayyid Muhammad bin Agil which was married to Uthman's daughters).

He also went to and studied in Egypt and once married to an Egyptian woman. He continued his journey to Tunisia, where he often exchanged ideas with the Mufti of Tunisia. From Tunisia he then studied in Algeria and later continued on to Morocco to study under various Moroccan scholars. He deepened his knowledge in Shariah in those North African countries before going to Syria to meet with scholars there. He continued his journey to present-day Turkey, which was still under the Ottoman Sultanate. Later, he went to Jerusalem in Palestine before returning to Mecca.

== Career ==
In 1862 (1279 AH) he went back to Batavia after 22 years of journey to seek knowledge and settled in Petamburan, Tanah Abang area. Over there, he wrote and compiled books, especially about amalil yaum (daily remembrances) and books about sins, unbelieving, polytheism and on subjects that are contrary to Aqidah. In his life, he has written about 116 books. One of the books he authored, al-Qawānin al-Syar'iyyah li ahli al-Majālisi al-Hukmiyati wal ‘Iftiayati, was even used as a reference in the religious courts system in Indonesia at least until the 1950s.

To make ends meet for him and his family, Uthman founded his own printing company named Pertjetakan Batu. Moreover, his lithographic printing press is the first in Indonesia and became a pillar of the local spreading of intellectualism within the period.

He also opened his Majelis Taklim (a gathering to seek religious knowledge) which was attended by many people including some other scholars from all over Batavia and surrounding areas, Among his students was Habib Ali Alhabsyi. He also plays an important role in the founding of Jamiat Kheir, an education foundation in Batavia in 1908.

Uthman was appointed as Mufti of Batavia in 1871 (1289 AH). The Dutch government paid him a monthly stipend starting from 1889 until his death to provide advice on Islamic policy, with the title of Honorary Adviser for Arab Affairs in 1891. As a mufti, many parties criticized Uthman for his closeness with the Dutch orientalist, Snouck Hurgronje. Hamid Algadri in his book wrote that his proximity to Snouck was based on his belief at that time that he (Snouck) was a Muslim. He did not know that Snouck only pretended to convert to Islam. The cooperation between Snouck and Uthman began when Snouck was still in Leiden as suggested in one of Snouck's letter on 8 July 1888 (28 Shawwal 1305 AH). After his arrival in Batavia in May 1889, Snouck discussed with the newly appointed Governor General Cornelis Pijnacker Hordijk the possibility to employ Uthman in colonial administration. Snouck also nominated Uthman as his assistant with an allowance of 100 guilders. Snouck suggested for himself to pay Uthman discreetly to avoid diminishing his authority among Muslims. All of Snouck's requests were granted by the colonial administration

Uthman was also active in local politics. Along with Hugronje he interfered with the appointment of a new Kapten Arab in Batavia in 1901 by supporting and pushing 'Umar Manqush instead of Balwael as candidate. On 27 March 1905, he was appointed as a native member of the municipal council of Batavia in 1905, but resigned on 27 July 1905. He most probably accepted the brief position under pressure from Snouck.

== Controversies ==
Habib Uthman's attitudes in politics were sometimes quite controversial, especially in his position on jihad and Holy War, particularly concerning a riot against the Dutch in Cilegon, Banten. Many scholars accused him of being a colonial stooge. Moreover, he was also hard against mystical practices, as he wrote in the book Manhaj al-Istiqamah. In a letter dated March 26, 1891, Snouck wrote about Sayyid Uthman's opinions in regards to jihad which was interpreted incorrectly by some Indonesian Muslims: "Many people were 'misled' by some law doctrines of jihad, and they thought that a Muslim person is justified in the presence of God to do acts such as to take possessions of the unbelievers, Chinese or Dutch people for himself ... " Uthman also assisted Hurgronje by issuing fatwa to support the Dutch war against Aceh.

Among other incidents which drew the ire of Batavian and Singaporean Arabs was Habib Uthman's reading of prayer on the occasion of the coronation of Queen Wilhelmina in 1898, at which time the Orde van de Nederlandsche Leeuw (Order of Netherlands Lion) was conferred on him. Calling him a friend of unbelievers, his opponents condemned Habib Uthman in letters to the Arabic Press and pamphlets printed in Singapore.

== His work ==
Kamus kecil (Jawi: قاموس عربية ملايو سوندا "an Arabic, Malay, Sundanese dictionary") by Uthman

Uthman published religious books in Arabic and Malay (written in Jawi script) on his own lithographic press.
