= Said Naum =

Sa'id bin Salim Na'um Basalamah (Arabic: سعيد بن سالم نعوم با سلمه, romanized: Sa'īd bin Sālim Na'ūm Bā Salamah) or better known as Said Naum (Arabic: سعيد نعوم, romanized: Sa'īd Na'ūm; Arabic pronunciation: [Saʕiːd bin Saːlim Naʕuwm Baːsalamah]) was the first Kapitan Arab in Batavia and a Muslim philanthropist in Dutch East Indies in the 19th century. He is known for his charities and endowment of large lands to be used as school and cemetery currently located in Tanah Abang.

== History ==
Said Na'um was a Hadhrami and lived in Palembang for sometime before later moved to Pekojan in Batavia. Said was a wealthy merchant who owned many trade ships and as a landlord in Batavia with extensive and large areas of lands. He was also a pious man, has a clean heart, loved people of piety, respect for the poor and needy and known for his very generous Waqf al-Turbah (land endowment), where he endowed hectares of his lands to be used for schools, cemeteries and mosques.

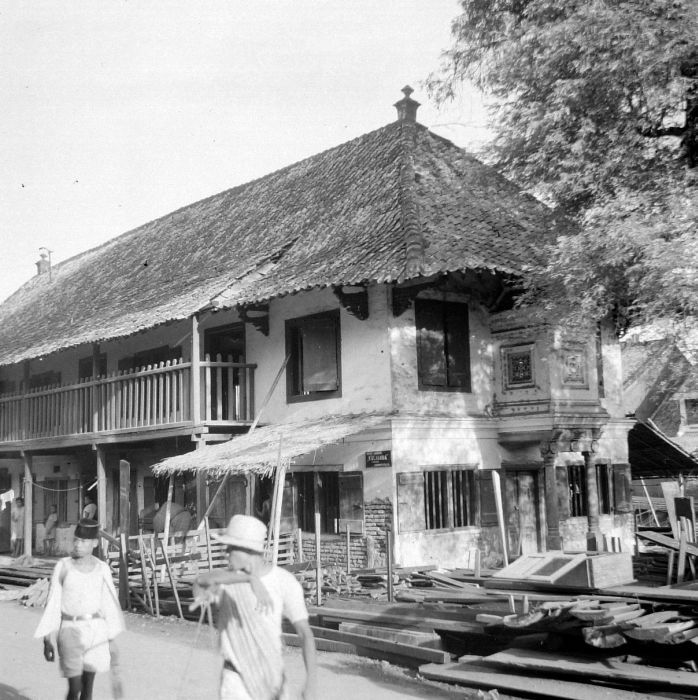
Langgar Tinggi mosque built by Syekh Said Naum, where the top floor was used as a mosque while the bottom were used as two houses in Pekojan, 1949

He married a girl named Zainah bint Ubayd, who gave him one only son named Muhammad who later died, and several daughters. The oldest was Syekhah, who was married to a righteous man, Sheikh Salim bin Umar Bahfen. His other daughter was Ruqayyah, who was married to Sheikh Abdullah bin Said Basalamah, and the last one was Nur, who married to Sheikh Said bin Ahmad Jawwas. All of them had children.

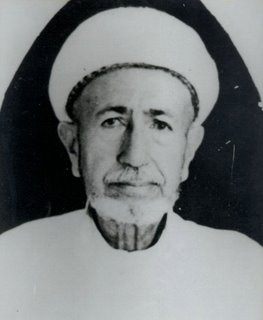
Grandson of Said Naum, Habib Abubakar bin Ali Shahab, who was the cofounder and first principal of Jamiat Kheir

After moving to Batavia, he later married another woman (it was common in the era for men to have multiple wives) named Nur binti Muhammad Audhah, who gave him a daughter named Muznah who then married to Ali bin Abubakar bin Umar Shahab, a Wulayti Hadhrami from Dammun near Tarim. From Muznah's marriage with Ali, Said had some grandchildren, namely Abubakar, Muhammad, and sidah. His grandson Abubakar later became the first principal of Jamiat Kheir school.

In Batavia, Said bought a large piece of land in area of Pekojan called Tanah Tinggi (Highland). On the land he later built a mosque called Masjid Tanah Tinggi in November 1833 CE (Rajab 1249 AH). Due to his popularity among Arab Indonesians, the Government of Dutch East Indies appointed him as the first Kapitan Arab in Batavia from 1844 to 1864.

Later in his life when his physical condition and business declined, his business was handed to his son-in-law Abdullah bin Said Basalamah. In 1844, he donated 22,240 square metres (5.50 acres) land as cemetery in Tanah Abang area, Batavia. Naum was buried in his endowed cemetery near the grave of Sheikh Salim bin Abdullah bin Sumair who died in 1855 CE (1271 AH).

In the 1970s, the government of Jakarta created a controversy by relocating the cemetery to Karet. They dug the graves and remains of hundreds of corpses were moved to the new location. Some part of the land he endowed is now used as K-12 school named after his name.

== See also ==
- Jamiat Kheir
