= Gunung Agung (bookstore) =

Indonesian bookstore

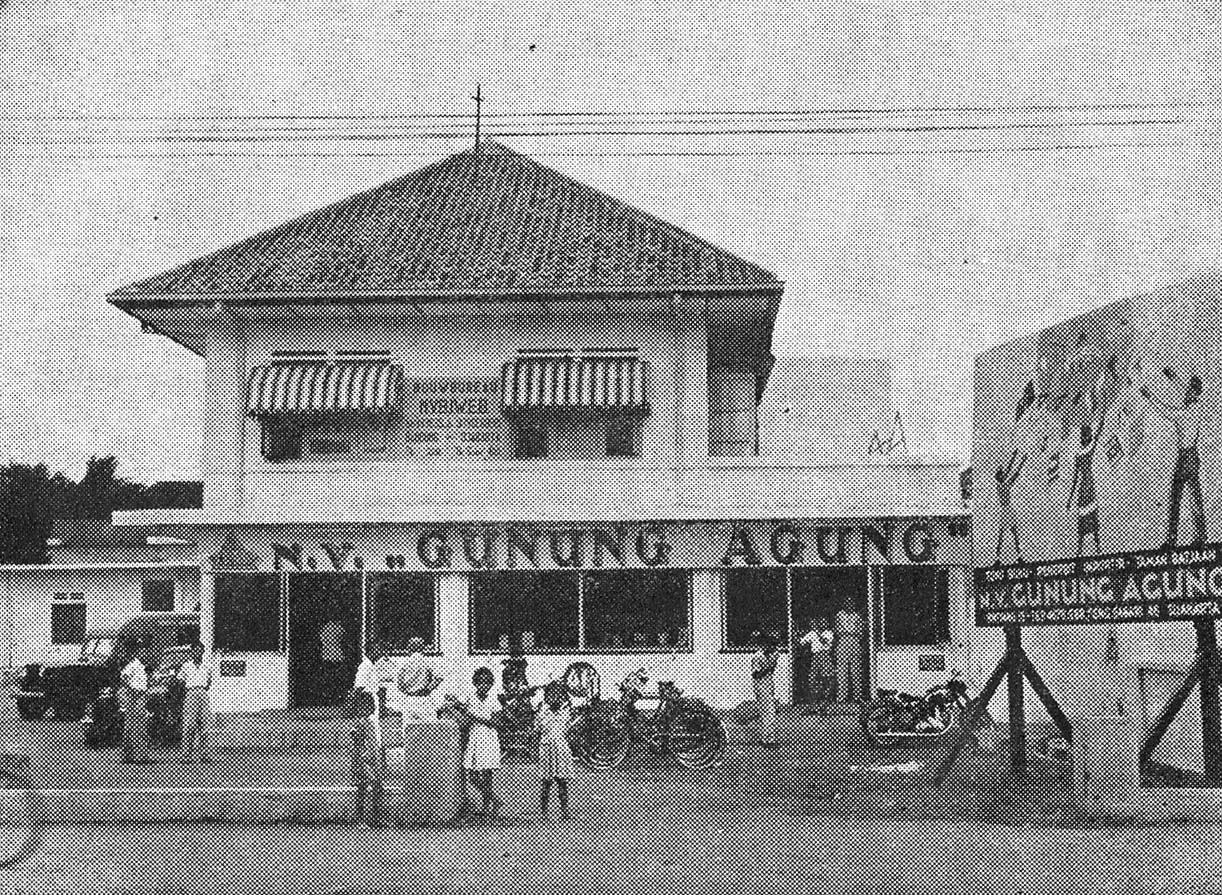
- Gunung Agung bookshop, 1954
- Company type: Private
- Industry: Bookstore
- Founded: 1953
- Founder: Tjio Wie Tay
- Headquarters: Kwitang, Jakarta, Indonesia
- Number of locations: 34
- Website: www.tokogunungagung.com

Gunung Agung is one of Indonesia's leading bookstore companies. It is named after the volcano of that name in Bali, Indonesia.

The origin of the bookstore dates back to 1953 when the late Tjio Wie Tay (1927–1990), who later became popularly known as Haji Masagung, started a kiosk selling books, newspaper and magazines under the partnership name Thay San Kongsie in Central Jakarta, part of Jakarta. As the business grew bigger and more complex in the early post-independence years, Masagung established a new company that published and imported books, named Firma Gunung Agung.

The company continued to grow with the support of poets, writers, scholars and journalists. Amidst the difficulties faced by the new nation, Masagung pioneered the effort to open the eyes of the nation through books. He organized Indonesia's first book fair in 1954.

In the period 1950–80 Gunung Agung published several book series, including Seri Kesusasteraan Indonesia, Sebuah Tinjauan Filosofis and Seri Ilmu dan Masjarakat.
