= Abdullah al-Misri =

Early 19th-century Arab-Malay writer

Abdullah al-Misri (b. late 18th century – d. early 19th century) was an Arab-Malay writer. He witnessed first hand the consequences of the Dutch East India Company going bankrupt in 1799; broad changes occurred such as when its possessions were taken over by the Dutch Crown, resulting in massive political change. The Dutch enterprise in Indonesia changed from a mercantile enterprise into a colonial state.

== Background ==
Born in Palembang, Sumatra, his family were originally from Kedah. His ancestors were from Ottoman-ruled Egypt which meant he was different from most creoles who were of Hadrami descent. According to the Tuhfat al-Nafis, he was close to the creole Hadramis, especially the al-kadris and rulers of Pontianak. In the early 19th century he was at a time in Besuki, East Java. His cousin Shaykh Abdurrahman, was the maternal grandfather of Usman bin Yahya, an important Islamic scholar of Indonesia.

== Writings ==
His writings closely quotes the Quran. One of his works writes about the issues of social hierarchy of his day, he was critical of the social hierarchy where people of wealthy and powerful lineage put themselves ahead of others. His writings mock the excessive pride of family lineage of Arabs in the Malay world and expanded on inequality on the lives of the Arabs in the archipelago.

One of his famous writings were the Hikayat Mareskalek (The Story of Mareskalek), where he criticized the aggressive rule of Herman Willem Daendels (1808–1811).

== Sources ==
- Mandal, Sumit. 2017. Becoming Arab: Creole Histories and Modern Identity in the Malay World. Cambridge University Press. pp. 23–42
- Tagliacozzo, Eric. 2009. Southeast Asia and the Middle East: Islam, Movement, and the Longue Durée. Stanford University Press.
