= Kapitan Arab =

High-ranking government position in the civil administration

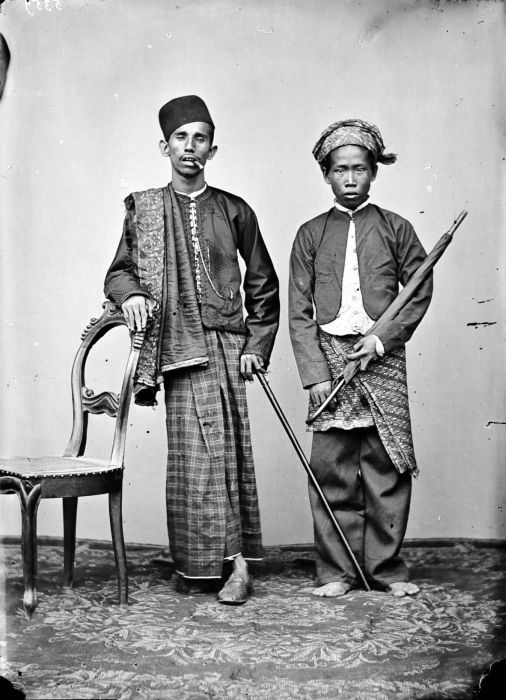
The Captain of Arabs with his servant in Tegal

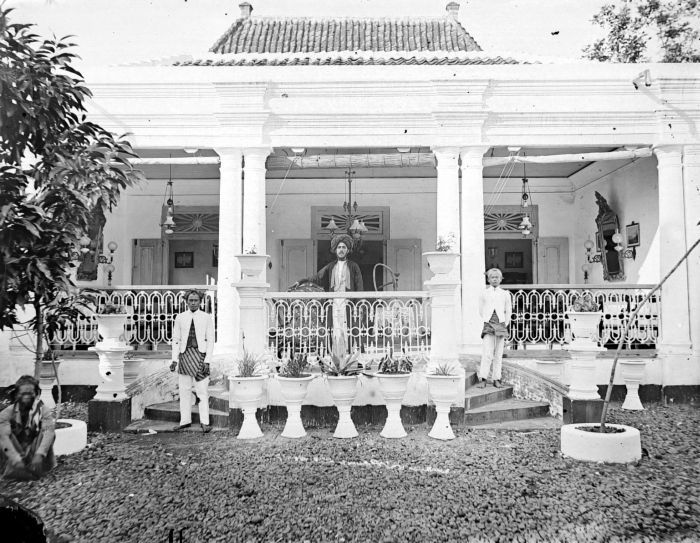
The Kapitein der Arabieren of Pekalongan at his terrace, circa 1920

Kapitan Arab or Kapten Arab (Captain of the Arabs; Dutch: Kapitein der Arabieren; Arabic: كابتن العرب, romanized: Kābitin al-'Arab) or Head of The Arabs (Dutch: Hoofd der Arabieren; Arabic: قائد العرب, romanized: Qā'id al-'Arab) is a position in the colonial Dutch East Indies appointed with the task of leading the ethnic Arab-Indonesians, who usually lived in concentrated clearly defined-living areas (Kampung Arab). The role was to provide liaison between his community and the government, to provide statistical information to the Dutch East Indies government on issues related to Arabs, to disseminate government regulations and decrees, and to ensure the maintenance of law and order.

== History ==
In Batavia, the Arabs, according to Van den Berg, settled in an area called Pekojan. Pekojan is from Indonesian word Pe-Koja-an, which means The Koja, a term for Muslim people of Gujarat, India. While Koja itself is from word Khoja. Until the end of the 18th century, the area was mostly dominated by Khoja Gujarati settlers until 19th century. When Van den Berg did the study (1884–1886), there were no more Gujarati. At that time, the majority of the settlers were Arabs and a handful of Chinese. Since about the 1970s, the Arabs are the minority and the Chinese turned into the majority. He described Pekojan as a slum and dirty area. Approximately one and half century ago, the Arabs also had moved and lived in the suburbs (now Central Jakarta), such as Krukut and Tanah Abang areas.

The Dutch East Indies had a constitutional law recognizing three categories of individuals in Batavia (and then later applied to other places): Europeans (dutch: Europeanen), Foreign Oriental (Vreemde Oosterlingen), and natives (Inlanders). As more and more immigrants immigrated from Hadramaut. The Dutch government started a law called wijkenstelsel in 1844 to segregate them from the rest of indigenous people. As result, the government required a head of the group, called Kapitan Arab, to be pointed from among the Arab community as a point of contact and liaison. The similar position was appointed for Kapitan Cina to Chinese. More than half of the Kapitan Arab appointed by the colonial government were non Sayyid people. This decision was made to undermine traditional Hadhrami assumption about their social status. The head sometimes is accompanied with an assistant called Luitenant van de Kapitein der Arabieren or simply Luitenant der Arabieren.

The first Kapitein der Arabieren pointed by the Dutch East Indies government in Batavia was Said Naum during period of 1844–1864. He was succeeded by Muhammad bin Abubakar 'Aydid for period of 1864-1877. Among other Arabs who had the position in Batavia was Hasan Argoubi, Muhammad Umar Ba-Behir (Arabic: محمد عمر بابحر, romanized: Mohammed Omar Baa Behir) and Umar bin Yusuf Mangus (Arabic: عمر منقوش, romanized: Omar Manqoosh) during the period of 1902-1931.

Umar Mangus was a rich merchant and had property business. For his service as the Kapitan Arab, Umar was awarded the title De Ridder in de Orde van Oranje-Nassau (Knight of The Order of Orange-Nassau). He was appointed on December 28, 1902 with Sheikh Ali bin Abdoellah bin Asir as his Luitenant der Arabieren.

Before Umar Mangus was appointed as a Kapitan Arab, most Arabs had decided to choose Sharif Abdullah ibn Husein Alaydrus, a rich merchant, famous for his generosity and had good behavior as well as prominent among the Arabs and the Europeans. Many people think that with his close relationship with Europeans, he would be willing to accept the Arab captaincy. The colonial government constantly urged him to accept the position, but he firmly rejected it. He was not alone in refusing, as this refusal had the support of respected Arab elders.

According to Snouck Hurgronje who observed in 1901, the Dutch colonial government had more difficulty appoint Kapitein der Arabieren as more and more indies-born Arabs (Muwallad) born who lacked authority compared to the pure-blood Hadramis (Wulayti) whose number diminished.

In Cirebon, there was an Arab Indonesian appointed as a captain in 1845. As in Batavia, the Arab village here was once the abode of the Gujarati or likely of the Bengali too. In 1872, the colony in Indramayu separated from Cirebon to appoint a captain (or head) of Arabs. In Banjarmasin, in around 1899, the Kapitan Arab was Said Hasan bin Idroes al-Habshi or more known as Habib Ujung Murung. The successor of Said Hasan as the Kapitein in South Kalimantan was Alwi bin Abdullah al-Habshi, who later moved to Barabai.

Similarly, in Tegal, Pekalongan, Semarang, Surabaya, Gresik, Pasuruan, Bangil, Lumajang, Besuki, Banyuwangi, Surakarta, Sumenep, and various places in the archipelago had their own Kapitan Arab. One of the reasons the colonial government did this was to segregate Arabs from the indigenous people. In Pekalongan, one of the Captains was Hasan Saleh Argubi. In Bangil, the Kapitan Arab were Saleh bin Muhammad bin Said Sabaja (1892), Muhammad bin Saleh Sabaja (1920), and Muhammad bin Salim Nabhan (1930). In Banyuwangi, some Kapitan Arab who were in positions, among others, was Datuk Sulaiman Bauzir, Datuk Dahnan, Habib Assegaf, and Ahmad Haddad. In Pasuruan, the Kapitein der Arabieren was a Sayyid named Alim al-Qadri, which is the grandfather of Hamid Algadri.

In Gresik, the Kapitan Arab in the 1930s was Husein bin Muhammad Shahab while Kapitan Arab of Surabaya was Salim bin Awab bin Sungkar, who had large land (86,500 square metres (21.4 acres)) in the City Center of Surabaya, West Ketabang.

According to two Baháʼí travelers from Iran and India who visited Makasar in 1885, the Iranian Baháʼí Sulayman Khan Tunukabanı, known as Jamal Effendi, and his Indian-Iraqi friend Sayyid Mustafa Rumı, the Kapitein der Arabieren in Makasar at the time was Said Ali Matard.

In Palembang, most of the Kapitein der Arabieren, if not all, lived in 13-Ulu subdistrict ("Seberang Ulu or "upstream bank" of the Musi river). There is no known records of who was the first Captain, but the last one was Ahmad Al Munawar (d. 1970), better known as Ayip Kecik (Little Sayyid) or Yipcik.

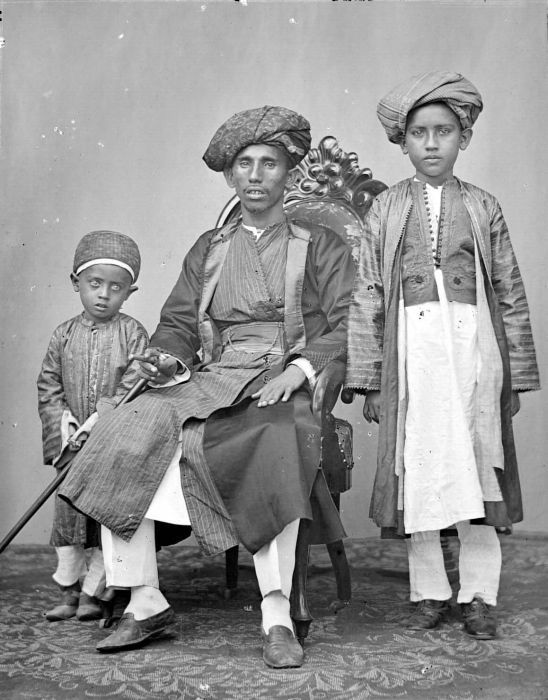
Kapten Arab of Tegal, Central Java

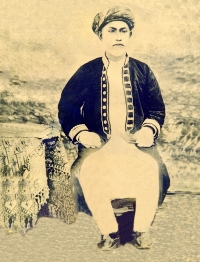
Habib Ujung Murung, Kapitein der Arabieren of Banjarmasin

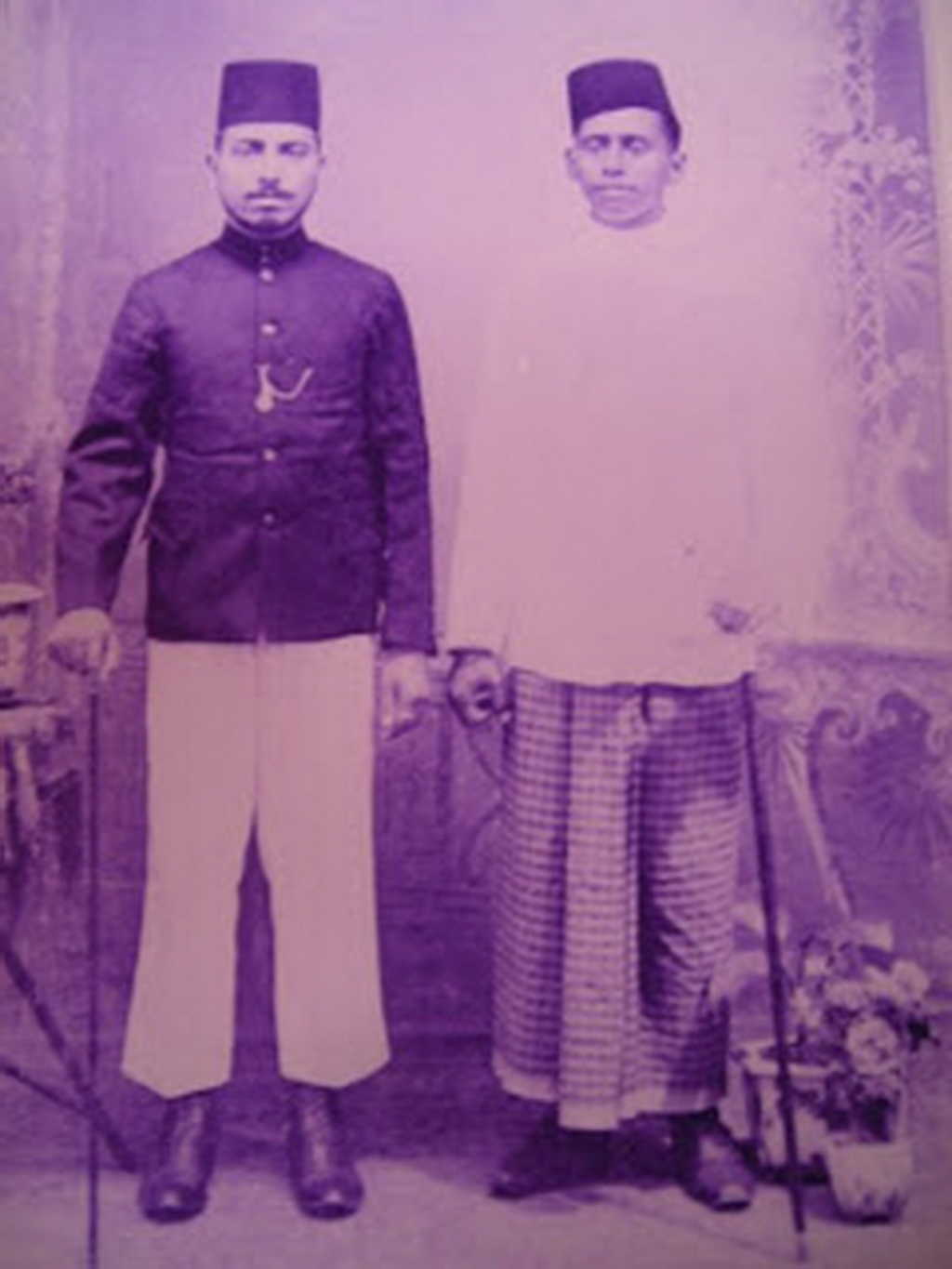
Alwi bin Abdullah bin Alwi bin Sheikh al-Habshi (left), Kapitein der Arabieren of Barabai.

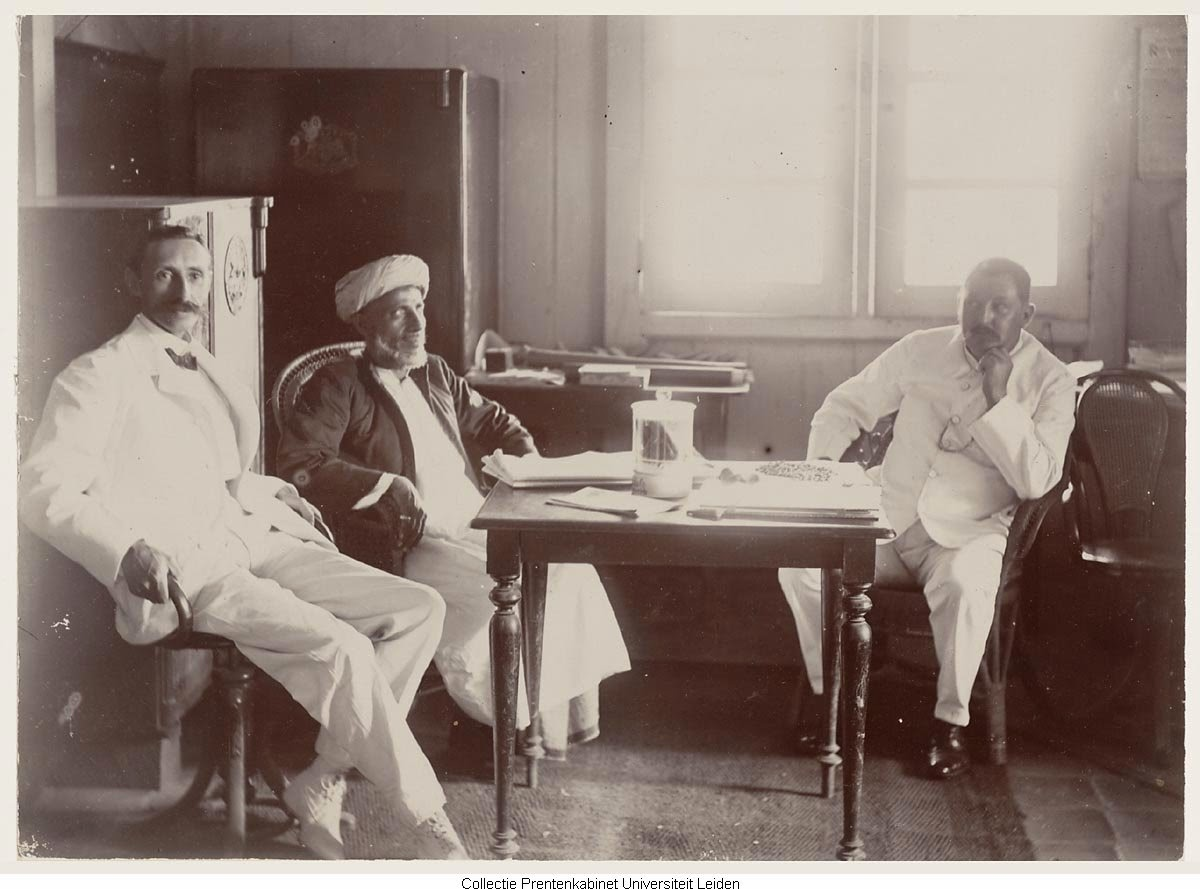
Kapitein der Arabieren of Menado

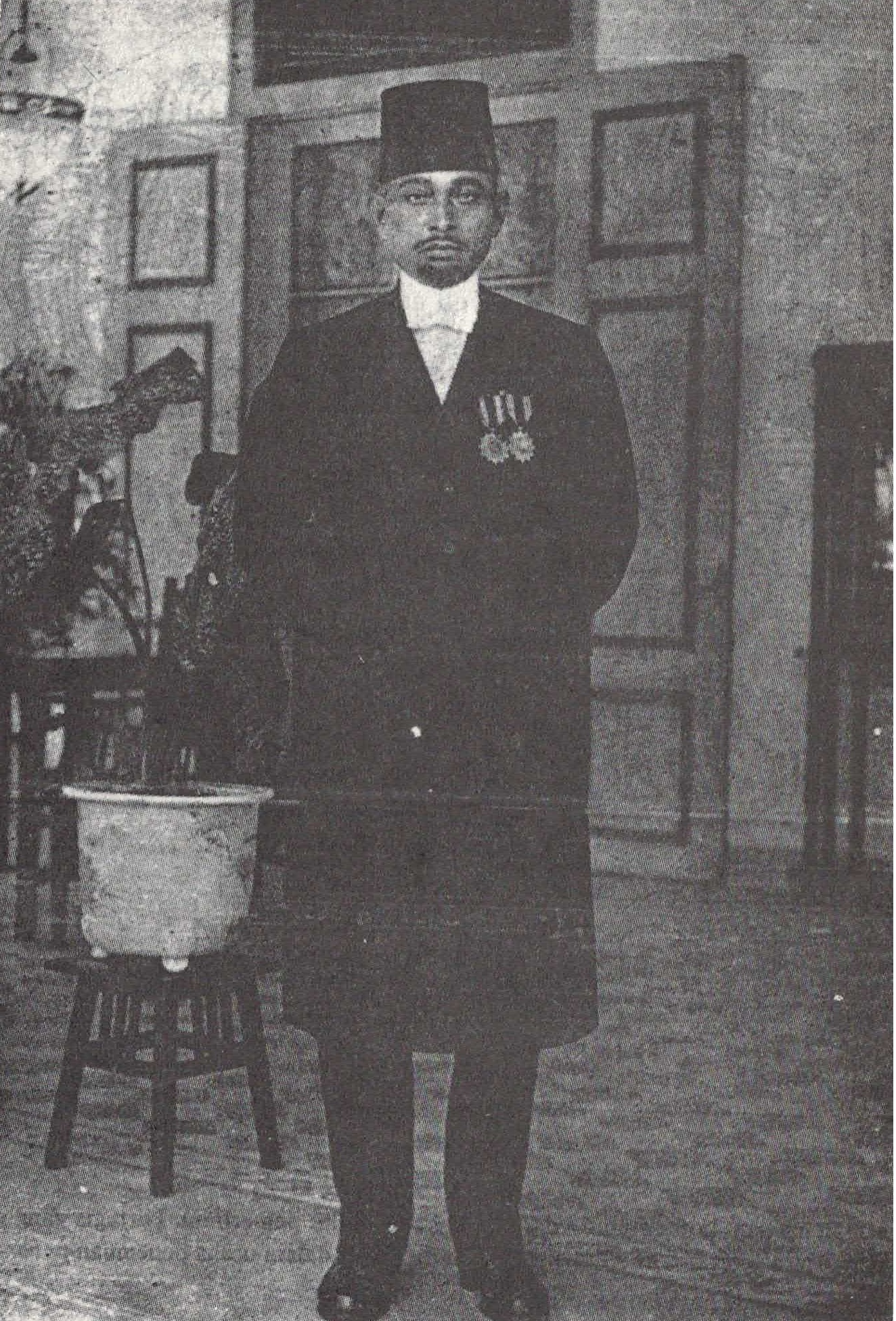
Alim Algadri - Kapitein der Arabieren of Pasuruan

== See also ==
- Kapitan Cina
- Kapitan Keling
- Arab Indonesians
