= Alwi bin Thahir al-Haddad =

Yang Berhormat Dato' Sayyid Alwi Thahir al-Haddad SPMJ
- سيد علوي طاهر الحداد
- Born: Alwi bin Thahir al-Haddad; August 7, 1884; Qaydun, Hadhramaut, Yemen
- Died: November 14, 1962 (aged 78); Johor Bahru, Johor, Federation of Malaya (now Malaysia)
- Resting place: Mahmoodiah Royal Mausoleum
- Citizenship: Malaysia
- Occupations: Islamic scholar, teacher
- Known for: Co-founder of Jamiat Kheir; Mufti of Johor; Historian
- Notable work: preaching, author
- Title: Habib
- Children: 16
- Father: Thahir

Alwi bin Thahir al-Haddad (Arabic: علوي بن طاهر الحداد, romanized: ʻAlwī bin Ṭāhir al-Ḥaddād, Arabic pronunciation: [ʕlwieː bin tˤ:hir al‿ħɐddɐd]; 14 Shawwal 1301 AH – 1382H or August 6, 1884 CE – November 14, 1962 CE) was an Islamic scholar known as the Mufti of Johor in twentieth century and also the co-founder of Jamiat Kheir and Al-Rabithah al-Alawiyyah foundations in Batavia during colonial Dutch East Indies.

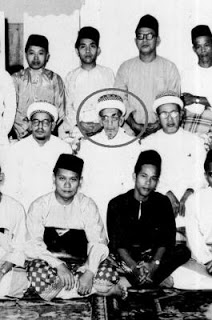
Habib Alwi Thahir Al-Haddad (circled), in Johor

== History ==
ʻAlwī bin Ṭāhir al-Ḥaddād was born in Qaydun, Hadhramaut, Yemen on August 7, 1884 CE ( 14 Shawwal 1301 AH). His surname al-Ḥaddād is one of the family names in Ba'Alawi sadah. The first Ba'Alawi to acquire the name al-Haddad (The Ironsmith) was Sayyid Ahmad, son of Abu Bakr. This sayyid, who lived in the ninth century of the Hijra (15th century in Gregorian calendar) was an 'alim who used to spend much of his time sitting at an ironsmith's shop in Tarim. There was another Sayyid with the name Ahmad which was well known at the time. To distinguish between Sayyid Ahmad bin Abubakar and the other Ahmad, people started adding al-Haddad to Sayyid Ahmad bin Abubakr. Since then his descendants continued to use surname al-Haddad.

The family lineage of ʻAlwi bin Ṭāhir is as follows: ʻAlwi bin Ṭāhir bin ʻAbdullah bin Taha ʻAbdullah bin Omar bin ʻAbdullah bin ʻAlwi bin Muhammad bin ʻAlwi bin Ahmad bin Abi Bakr Abu Thahir. Thahir is a Sayyid of Ba'Alawi sadah with his family lineage traces back to Ali ibn Abi Talib and Fatimah. He had sons who later moved to the southern part of the Arabian Peninsula, among them were Thahir and Hamid.

ʻAlwī bin Ṭāhir al-Ḥaddād died on November 14, 1962, and was buried at the Mahmoodiah Royal Mausoleum in Johor Bahru.

== Education ==
ʻAlwi had childhood dream of becoming scholar. This was supported by the intelligence and determination in his studies. He liked to approach many Islamic scholars during his youth time. Some of his teachers in Hadhramaut were Habib Ahmad bin al-Hasan al-Attas al-Alawi, Habib Thahir bin Umar al-Haddad, Habib Muhammad bin Thahir al-Haddad, al-Mu’ammar Sirajuddin Sheikh Umar bin Othman bin Muhammad Ba-Othman al-'Amoudi al-Siddiqi al-Bakri. He studied Hadiths from Sayyid 'Abdur Rahman bin Sulaiman al-Ahdal. He also studied to his relatives, such as his uncle Habib Abdullah bin Tāha al-Ḥaddād, and also to Habib Ṭāhir bin Abi Bakri al-Ḥaddād.

ʻAlwi finished reading the Ihya Ulum ad-Din (The Revival of Religious Sciences) of Imam al-Ghazali while he was still 12 years old. In the age of 17 years he had started teaching, and started teaching from serious and high caliber textbooks when he was just only 20 years old. The areas of his teachings including Tafsir, Hadith, Fiqh, Usul al-fiqh, History, Astronomy, Nahwu, Sharaf, Balaghah (Arabic Rhetoric), Philosophy and Tasawwuf.

Habib ʻAlwi is also known as the scholar in the history of Alawiyyin.

== Career ==
During his life, ʻAlwi traveled to various places away from his hometown, such as to Somalia, Kenya, Mecca, Dutch East Indies, Malaysia and others. In countries he stopped by, he always spent time to preach and teach. In Batavia, Habib ʻAlwi taught at Madrasah Jamiat Kheir. In fact, he was also the co-founder as well as the first vice principal of the school.

In addition, he also taught in Bogor and other places in Java. Everytime he taught, it was always crowded. Some of popular figures learned from him were Sayyid ʻAlwi bin Sheikh Bilfaqih al-Alawi, Sayyid ʻAlwi bin Abbas al-Maliki, Sayyid Salim bin Ali al-Jindan, Sayyid Abu Bakar al-Habshi, Sayyid Muhammad bin Ahmad al-Haddad, Sayyid Abdullah bin Abdul Qadir Bilfaqih, Sayyid Husein bin Abdullah bin Husein al-Attas, Sayyid Hasan Muhammad al-Masyath al-Makki and Abdullah bin Nuh.

The Sultanate of Johor Bahru in Malaysia chose him to serve as mufti from 1934 to 1941, first as the third mufti of the Johor government to replace the preceding Mufti of Johor, Datuk Sayyid Abdul Qadir bin Mohsen al-Attas. and from 1947 to 1961 to replace the fifth mufti, Tan Sri Dato' Haji Hassan Yunus. During his position as Mufti, ʻAlwi issued 12000 fatwas. He also wrote several books, among them are:

- Al-Qaul al-Fashl fi Maa li Bani Hashim wa Quraisy wal-Arab Min al-Fadhl (two volumes)
- Masalah Durus al-Sirah al-Nabawiyah (two volumes)
- Mukhtashar Aqd al-Aali of Idrus bin Umar al-Habshi
- I’anah an-Nahidh fi Ilm al-Faraidh
- Majmuah min Ulum al-Falaq (2 volumes)
- Ath-Thabaqat al-Alawiyyah
- Sejarah masuknya Islam di Timur Jauh (The history of Islam in the Far East)
