= Kwitang =

- Administrative village
- Interactive map of Kwitang
- Coordinates: 6°11′S 106°50′E
- Country: Indonesia
- Province: DKI Jakarta
- Administrative city: Central Jakarta
- District: Senen
- Postal code: 10420

Kwitang is an administrative village (kelurahan) in the district (kecamatan) of Senen, Central Jakarta. It is one of the historic administrative village of Jakarta. The boundary of Kwitang is the Ciliwung to the west, Jalan Kramat Kwitang to the north, Jalan Kramat Raya to the east, and Jalan Kramat 4 to the south.

The administrative village was locally known as the location of the Kwitang book market, especially in the 1970s.

== History ==
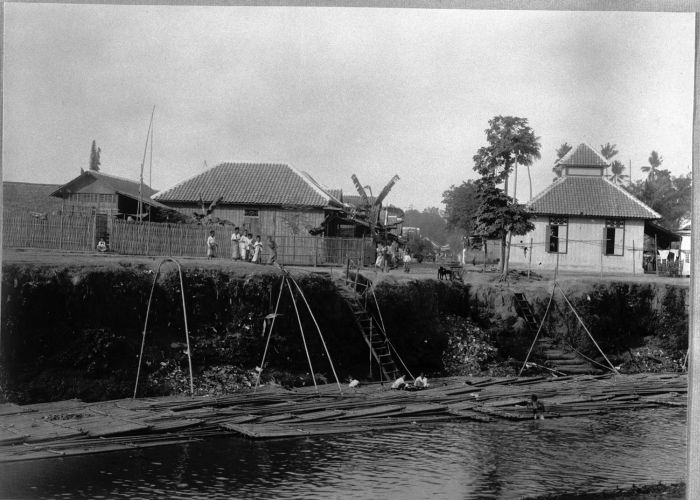
Kampung Kwitang by the Ciliwung in 1910s.

The name Kwitang was first mentioned for a neighborhood situated between a road to the east of Ciliwung (which would be developed as part of the Groote Postweg during the governorship of Daendels) and a section of the Ciliwung to the south of Noordwijk (now Jalan Ir. H. Juanda). The neighborhood was initially dwelled (rented) by immigrants from China. The first Chinese migrants in Batavia arrived from Fujian (or Hokkien); this is followed by migrants from Guangdong or Kwantung. Chinese migrants from Guangzhou (Canton) belonged to the Punti ethnic group, a relatively small ethnic group which settled themselves in the neighborhood of Kwitang, Batavia. The name Kwitang itself was derived from Gnuidang, a Zhangzhou name for the province of Guangdong; Zhangzhou being the most common dialect of Hokkien used in Java. Since then, the neighborhood with its Punti population was known as Kampong Kwitang. The claim of the name Kwitang from a person named Kwee Tang Kiam is disputed, as the surname Kwee is not common in Batavia at that time.

In 1824, the area of Kampong Kwitang was sold to the government (verponding) according to the Resolutie van de Governeur Genaraal in Rade dd 28 Desember 1824 No 25. Kampong Kwitang became known as Land Kwitang. The first to buy the Land Kwitang parcel was F. Rijnkarl (1839). Later, Land Kwitang was acquired by Voute de Guérin (1847). By 1887, the area of Kwitang had been divided into two: Kwitang Oost (which include Kampung Tanah Tinggi and Kampung Rawa) and Kwitang West (the area which corresponds to the present administrative village of Kwitang). In mid 19th-century, the missionary started their activity in Kwitang West, which lead to the establishment of Kwitang Church.

In 1919, Land Kwitang West was acquired by the Burgemeester Batavia for f. 150,000. The acquisition was done after the acquisition of Land Menteng in 1913. In 1925, Heusen & Mees sold the Kwitang Oost (Tanah Tinggi) for f. 70,000.

== Book market ==
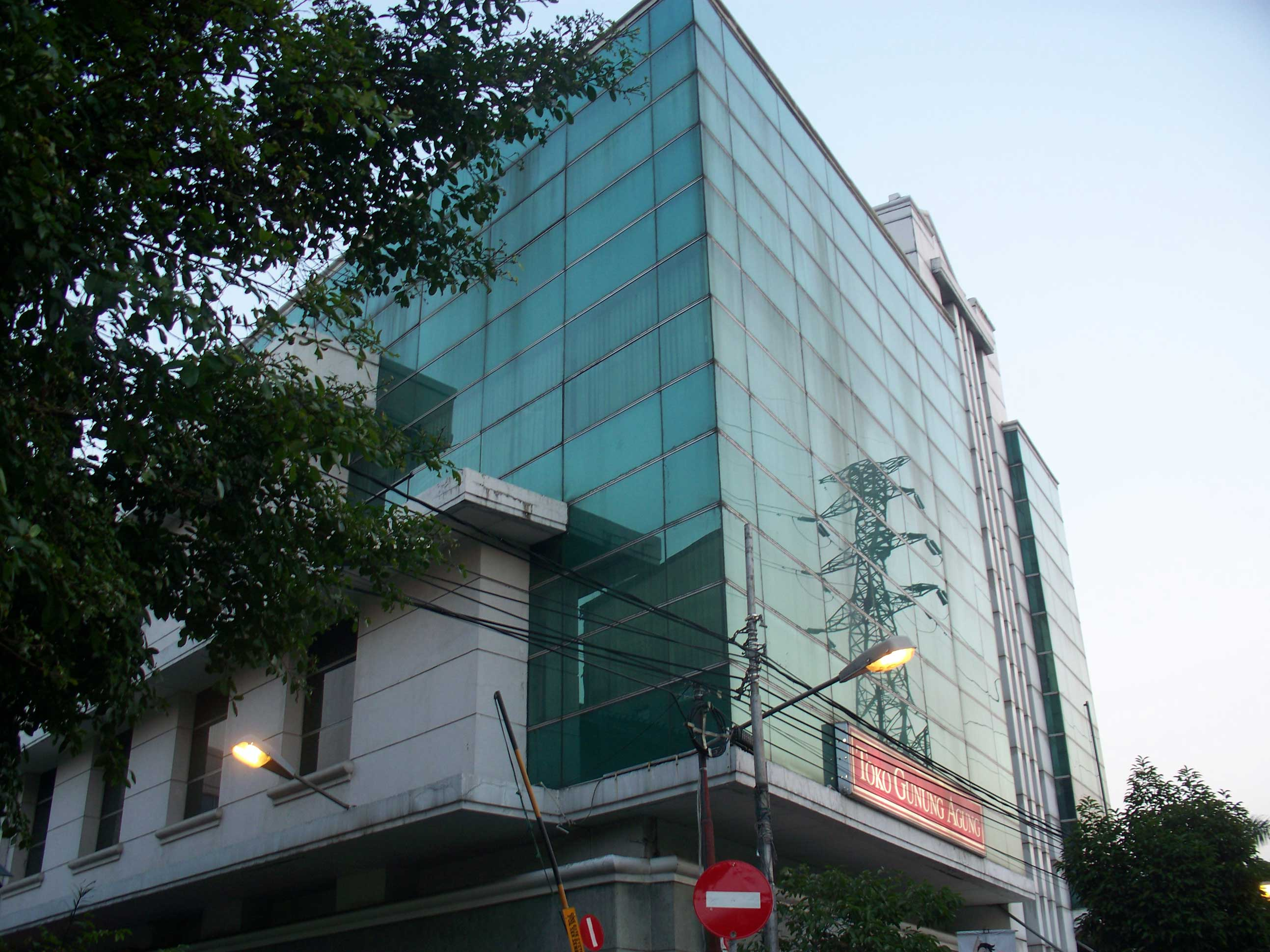
Gunung Agung, a 1950s-established bookstore established in Kwitang.

Gunung Agung bookstore began its book selling business in Jalan Kwitang in 1953. At least since the 1970s, Kwitang was known as the place to get second-hand books in Jakarta. The book stalls were usually spread along the sidewalk of Jalan Kwitang and especially along the Ciliwung.

Since 2008, these booksellers have been relocated to other sites by the city administration, including to the nearby Pasar Senen.

== List of important places ==
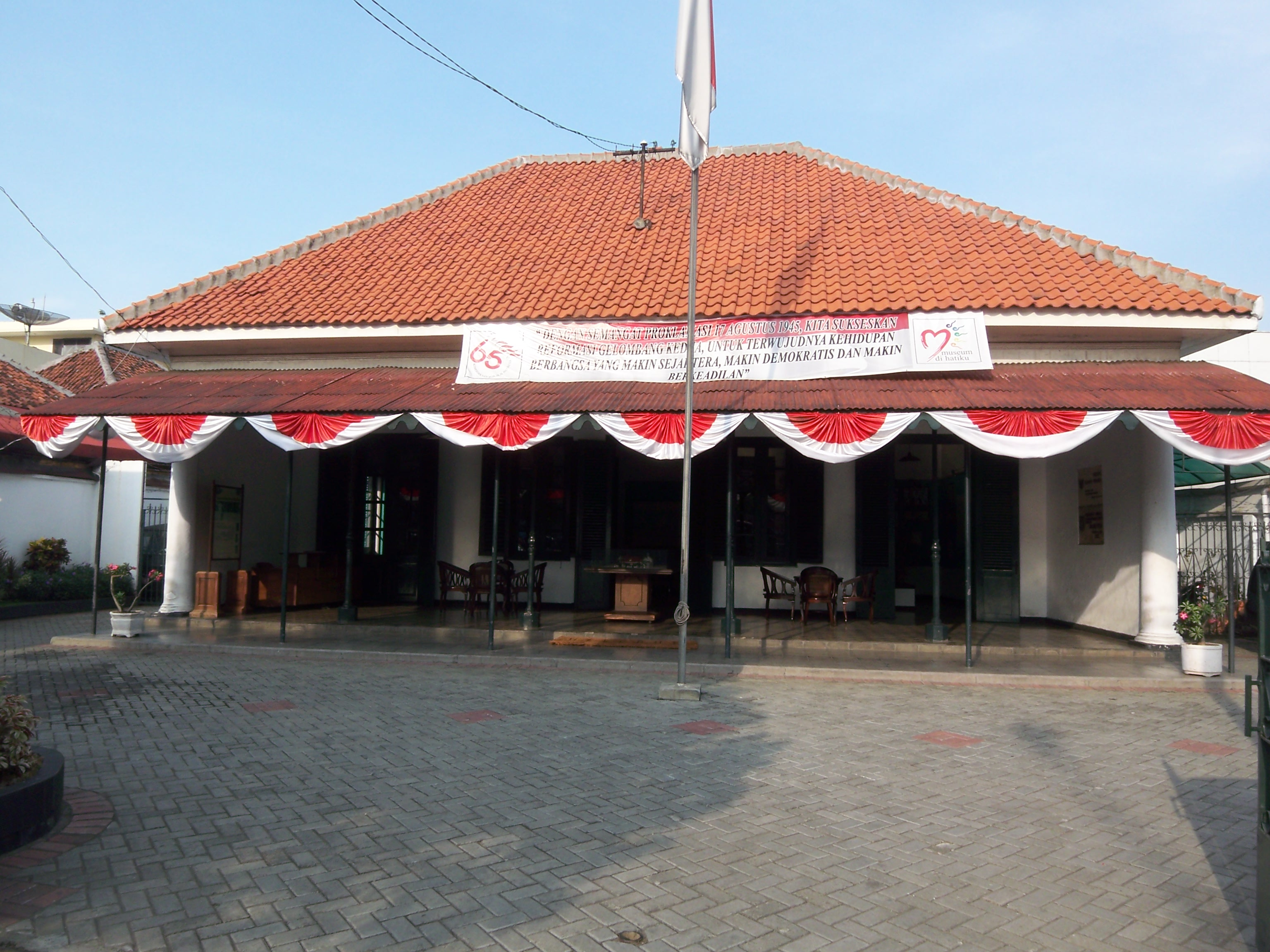
The building of the Museum Sumpah Pemuda.

Below are several landmarks located within the historic Kwitang neighborhood.

- Gunung Agung bookstore, the location of the company's foundation.
- Kwitang Church
- Museum Sumpah Pemuda
- Tomb of Habib Ali Kwitang

== Cited works ==
- Batavia en Omstreken 1887 [Batavia and Surrounding 1887] (Map) (Den Haag ed.). 1:40000 (in Dutch). Cartography by J. Vos. 1887.
- Gilang Permadi (2007). Pedagang kaki lima:riwayatmu dulu, nasibmu kini!. Yudhistira Ghalia Indonesia. ISBN 9789790191228.
- Kwee Kek Beng (1963). "Pasar Senen sudah lebih 200 tahun usianja". Mingguan Djaja (51–60).

== See also ==
- Senen
- List of administrative villages of Jakarta
