= Nonni =

Nonni may refer to:

- Nonni river, an alternate name for Nen River in Northeast China
- Nonni, nickname of Icelandic children's author Jón Sveinsson
- Nonni, Italian word meaning grandfathers or grandparents
- Ottaviano Nonni (1536-1606), Italian painter

== See also ==
- Nonni and Manni, a 1988-1989 West German-Icelandic children's TV series
