= L. W. C. van den Berg =

Dutch politician

Dr. L. W. C. van den Berg
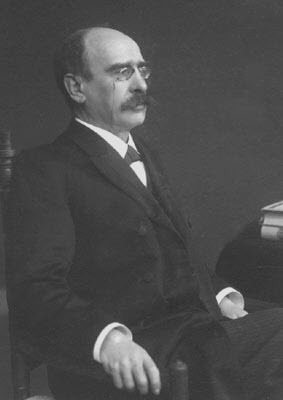
- Lodewijk Willem Christiaan
- Born: Lodewijk Willem Christiaan van den Berg; October 19, 1845; Haarlem, Netherlands
- Died: March 2, 1927 (aged 81); Delft, Netherlands
- Education: Leiden University; Doctorate in Social Sciences
- Occupations: Scholar, researcher, professor, politician
- Employers: Dutch East Indies government; Indische Instelling Delft
- Known for: Research on Arab Indonesians
- Notable work: Le Hadhramout et les colonies arabes dans l'archipel Indien
- Title: drs., Ph.D
- Spouse: Françoise Steup (m. 1884)
- Parents: Simon van den Berg (father); Sophie Charlotte (mother)

Lodewijk Willem Christiaan van den Berg (October 19, 1845 – March 2, 1927) was a Dutch oriental scholar in the Dutch colonial era famous with his research on Arab Indonesians of Hadhrami descent, which was the first detailed research of its kind in the world at the time.

== Education and career ==
Van den Berg was born in Haarlem, Netherlands, on October 19, 1845. His father was Simon van den Berg and his mother was Sophie Charlotte Immerzeel. He married Françoise Steup in 1884.

After completing the gymnasium, he studied at Taal-, Land- end Volkenkunde in Leiden University, graduating summa cum laude in 1868 with a dissertation on Muslim property law, De Contractu Do Ut Des. Soon afterwards, he left for the Dutch East Indies where he held several clerical and judicial posts until, in 1878, he was given the prestigious, newly created position of Official for the practice of "Indische" languages and Adviser for Eastern (Oostersche) languages and Muslim law.

Van den Berg continued his exploration of Muslim law by publishing De Beginselen van het Mohammedaansche Recht, Volgens de Imâm's Aboe Hanifat en Sjâfi‘i (The Principles of the Mohammedan Law, according to the Imams Abu Hanifah and Shafi'i) in 1874. Second and third editions followed in 1878 and 1883. Van den Berg's interest in the Arab communities of Java led him to complete an important work on this subject.

His book on ranks and titles on Java and Madura should also be noted among several other contributions, but his book which has been most referenced and cited for topic of Indonesian Hadhrami is Le Hadhramout et les colonies arabes dans l'archipel Indien ("The Hadhramaut and Arab settlements in the Indian archipelago")

Many times van den Berg had opposite opinions with another Dutch orientalist, Christiaan Snouck Hurgronje. Van den Berg's first exchange with Snouck concerned van den Berg's own paper publication on Imam al-Nawawi's Minhâdj at-talibîn (French: Le guide des zélés croyants). Snouck stressed that including the original Arabic text was superfluous as excellent copies were available throughout the Muslim world. While complimenting van den Berg on the smoothness of the French text, Snouck also questioned whether the various terms found in the Fiqh books should be translated because the Arabic words were critical technical terms, "the pillars" of knowledge and wisdom.

In July 1881, van den Berg wrote a critique of the Holle's recommendations which called for strict monitoring Islam in the East Indies. In a matter of putting spies in Mecca, for example, according to van den Berg, it is completely useless because most Arabs residing in Nusantara were from Hadhramaut. Hadhramis were considered strangers in the eyes of the Arabs of Mecca.

A state commission was established in 1890 for revision of colonial legislation in the field of private law and van den Berg was appointed as its secretary.

A decade later, Snouck used another opportunity to critique van den Berg. In this case, it concerned Aceh. In 1880, Th. Der Kinderen, a member of the Council of the Dutch East Indies, and van den Berg as his secretary had been instructed to visit Aceh and report on its "unruly" conditions. With the Aceh problem continuing to be unresolved, Snouck (who had arrived in Java in 1889 to become Advisor for Native Affairs) was sent to Aceh in 1891. His seven-month stay in that part of Aceh under Dutch military control resulted in a lengthy report and the publication of a two-volume De Atjèhers. Even though Snouck criticized him many times, van den Berg's career does not seem to have been affected negatively.

Van den Berg became a corresponding member of the Royal Netherlands Academy of Arts and Sciences in 1876 and resigned in 1888.

Van den Berg returned to the Netherlands in 1887 to accept a professorship at the Indische Instelling Delft, a college for colonial administration. His tenure at the institute moved along smoothly while he continued to publish. In his later life, he also was active in politics for the Anti-Revolutionary Party, serving on the municipal council of Delft from 1901 to 1904 and as mayor of the same town between 1910 and 1920. He was member of the Provincial Council of South Holland from 1902 to 1911 and a member of the Senate between 1911 and 1923.

Van den Berg died on March 2, 1927, in Delft. Although the name of L. W. C. van den Berg is not as famous as his successor, Snouck Hurgronje, on researches on Islam and Arabs in East Indies, but van den Berg still has been a very important orientalist.
