= Dammun, Yemen =

Dammun دمّون
- Village
- Dammun location in Yemen
- Coordinates: 16.0705556°N 49.0116667°E
- Country: Yemen
- Governorate: Hadramaut
- Directorate: Sayun District

Area
  - Total: 7 km^{2} (2.7 sq mi)
- Elevation: 591 m (1,939 ft)

Population
  - Total: 1,788
  - Density: 260/km^{2} (660/sq mi)
- Time zone: UTC+3

Dammun (Arabic: دمّون) is a wadi (river valley) village in Hadramaut, Yemen, about 4.2 kilometres (2.6 mi) northeast of Tarim. Dammun is known for its fertile agricultural land which is the gate and the front of the Wadi Douan, famous for the production of the finest Yemeni honey. The place is known in the region since ancient times as a haven for fugitives from tribal conflicts and feuds or wars for its stronghold on the hills and mountains.

The village is sparse as there are only a few houses built and some farms. Dammun is also where al-Hajerin is located up above a hill, where many historical monuments are located near the settlement of Ripon, which was built on the ruins of the city dating back to pre-Islam, and where there is a temple called Sen, also known as the temple of the moon. In this location there is history of a sixth-century poet-prince Imru al-Qays banished by his father for excessive drunkenness and fornication. Imru al-Qays was later known as al-Malik al-Dillil (the Wandering King) and posthumously as Dhul al-Quruh (He of Sores).

The huntsmen of Dammun are known to hunt with nets and firearms. Dammun, though once well known for its wine presses, has, since the coming of Islam, produced many great Sufi saints as well as traditional scholars and poets. One of these was al-Mu’allim ’Abd al-Haq al-Dammuni (d. 1872), whose compositions in verse have been used extensively by some modern scholars (Muhammad ‘Abd al-Qadir Ba-Matraf, for example) as source material for history covering the Kathiri-Yafi’i wars during the latter part of the nineteenth century. Indeed, while al-Jahiz (d. 869) was to state that poetry amongst the Arabs was used ‘to immortalize events’, al-Jumahi (d. 917) maintained that ‘verse in the Days of Ignorance was to the Arabs the diwan (register) of all they knew’.
