= Wulayti =

Arabic term

The Wulayti or Wulaiti (from Arabic: ولاية, wulâyatiỳ, literally means territory or state ) is a term used to call a first generation of Arab immigrant born in the territory of their homeland. The term is more commonly used to refer to a Hadhrami immigrant.

== See also ==
- Muwallad
