= List of Arab Indonesians =

This list of Arab Indonesians includes names of figures from ethnic Arab descent, especially Hadhrami people, in Indonesia. This list also includes the names of figures who are genetically of Arab blood, both those born in the Arab World who later migrated to Indonesia (wulayti), or who were born in Indonesia with Arab-blooded parents or Arab Indonesians mix (Muwallad).

This list does not include Walisongo descendants (who originally surnamed Azmatkhan) who have assimilated perfectly with the local residents, such as the descendants of the sultan of Banten (who have the first names Tubagus and Ratu), Cirebon, and Palembang. While the sultans of the sultanates mentioned earlier will still be included in this list. Furthermore, Walisongo descendants who have verified their lineage up to Ahmad al-Muhajir, through Sayyid Jumadil Kubra (Walisongo's ancestor), will still be included.

This list also includes descendants of Jafar Sadek, an Arab who spread Islam in the Maluku Islands in the 13th century, who became sultans in several kingdoms in Maluku such as Ternate and Tidore. And descendants of Abdullah ibn Shaykh al-Aydarus, great-grandfather of Tun Habib Abdul Majid, who was the ancestor of Bendahara dynasty and sultans in Johor and Lingga.

The figures who can be verified their Arabic identity with their last name (surname or Arab clans, see list of Hadhrami surnames in Indonesia) and first name (honorific title name, such as Sayyid or Sayid, Syarif or Syarifah, Sidi, and Wan) will not be given a footnote.

== Academics ==
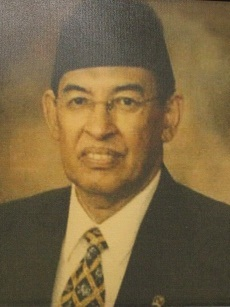
Quraish Shihab

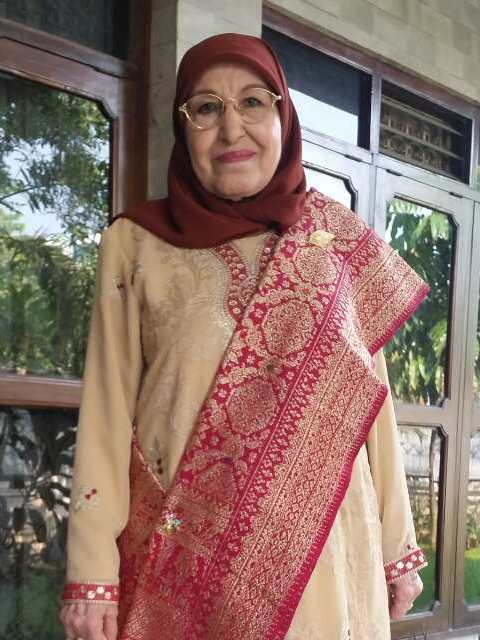
Nabilah Lubis

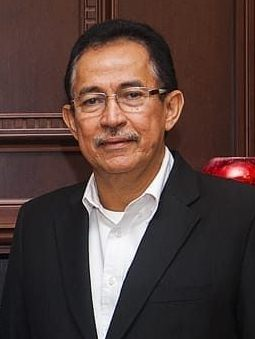
Muhammad Anis

- Abdul Kadir Jailani, diplomat, Indonesian Ambassador to Canada (2019–)
- Abdullah Shahab, academics; professor of the Faculty of Industrial Technology, Sepuluh November Institute of Technology
- Abdurrahman Shihab, rector of Alauddin Islamic State University (1973–1979), rector of Muslim University of Indonesia (1959–1965), member of Constitutional Assembly of Indonesia (1956–1959)
- Ahmad Fikri Assegaf, lawyer, co-founder of "Assegaf Hamzah & Partners" law firm, co-founder of PT Justika Siar Publika (Hukumonline.com)
- Amany Lubis, rector of Syarif Hidayatullah State Islamic University Jakarta (2017–) (Note: Mandailing father and Egyptian mother (see Lubis 2012, p. 415))
- Anis Saggaff, rector of Sriwijaya University (2015–)
- Des Alwi, historian, diplomat, writer and advocate (Note: Sultan of Palembang descendant father and Moroccan mother from Baadila clan (see Alwi 2008, pp. 11–13))
- Fahri Bachmid, Advocate, constitutional law expert, and intellectual
- Farhat Abbas, lawyer (Note: Malays father and Arab Hadhrami mother from Ba 'Alawi sada clan named Syarifah Masnon)
- Hasan Kleib, diplomat, Permanent Representative of Indonesia to the United Nations (2010–2011)
- Husin Bagis, diplomat, Indonesian Ambassador to the United Arab Emirates (2016–)
- Ibrahim Sjarief Assegaf, lawyer, advocate, co-founder of PT Justika Siar Publika (Hukumonline.com)
- Idrus Alwi, a specialist in cardiovascular medicine (Note: Idrus Alwi clan is bin Shahab)
- Ismail Fajrie Alatas, anthropologist; historian; professor of Middle Eastern & Islamic Studies, New York University
- Ivan Hadar, sociologist, former executive director of Institute for Democracy and Education (IDe)
- Moeslim Taher, rector of Jayabaya University (1962–1988), member of Supreme Advisory Council (1983–1988)
- Muhammad Anis, rector of University of Indonesia (2014–) (Note: Muhammad Anis clan is bin Shahab)
- Muhammad Idrus Alhamid, academics; professor of the Faculty of Engineering, University of Indonesia
- Muhsin Labib, philosophy lecturer at Syarif Hidayatullah State Islamic University Jakarta
- Nabilah Lubis, philologist, professor at the Faculty of Adab and Humanities of Syarif Hidayatullah State Islamic University Jakarta (until 2007)
- Najelaa Shihab, teacher, psychologist, founder of the "Cikal" educational institution
- Nono Anwar Makarim, legal practitioners
- Quraish Shihab, professor, rector of Syarif Hidayatullah State Islamic University Jakarta (1992–1998), Minister of Religious Affairs (1998), Indonesian ambassador to Egypt (1999–2002)
- Rizal Alaydrus, physician nutrition specialist, actor, model
- Salim Said, political, military, and defense observers; professor of political science, Indonesian Defence University and Muhammadiyah University of Malang; Indonesian ambassador to Czech Republic (2006–2010)
- Syed Muhammad Naquib al-Attas, Indonesian-born Malaysian Muslim philosopher
- Yasmine Zaki Shahab, anthropologist; professor of the Faculty of Social and Political Sciences, University of Indonesia
- Faizah binti Awad, professor, rector of State Islamic Institute of Kendari (2019–2023)

== Activists ==
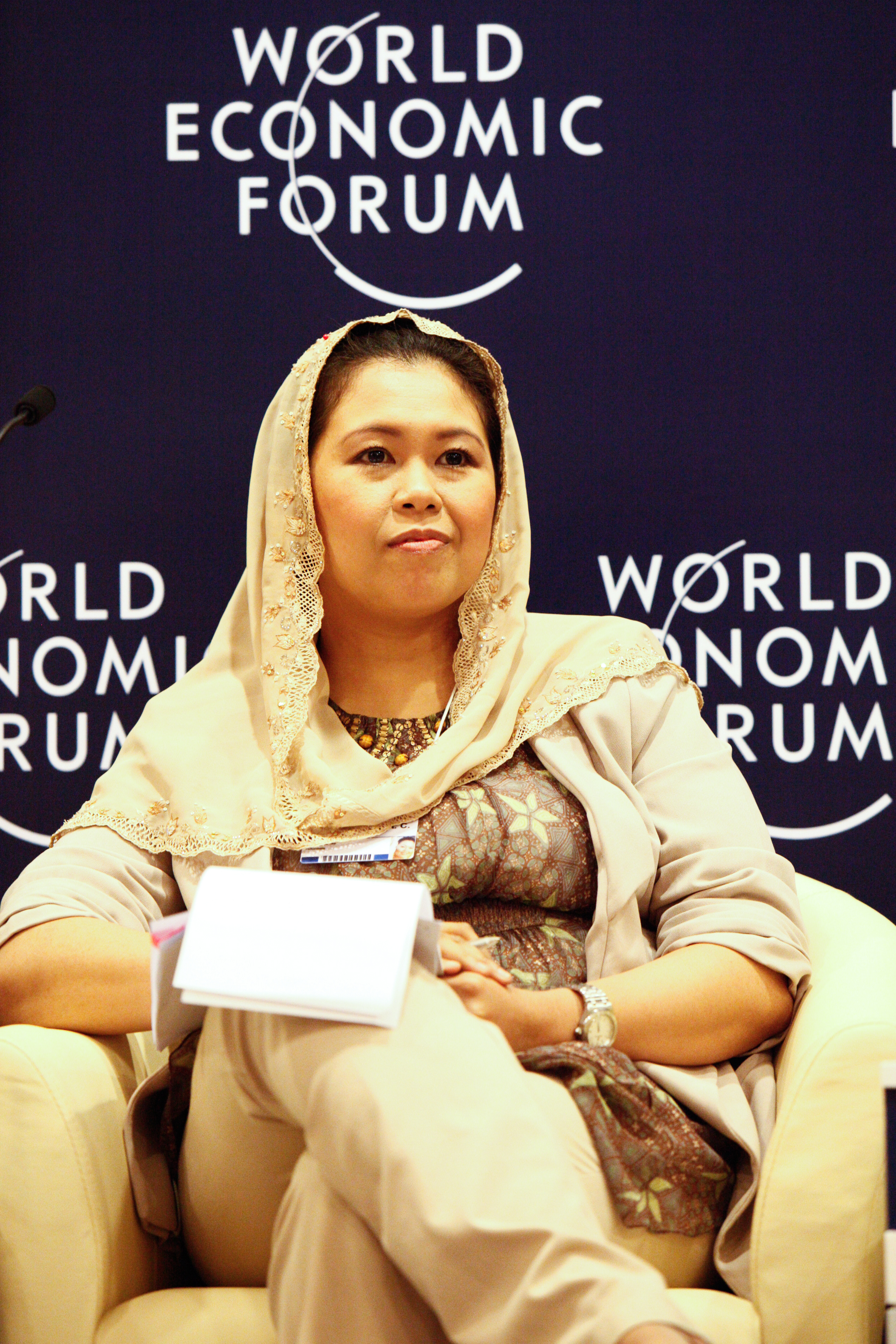
Yenny Wahid

- Farha Ciciek, women and human rights activist, founder of the amusement park "Tanoker Ledokombo"
- Haikal Hassan Baras, Islamic activist, preacher
- Haikal Hilabi, environmental activist, entrepreneur
- Iqbal Assegaf, political activist, chairman of the Ansor Youth Movement (1995–1999), chairman of the Indonesian Islamic Student Movement (1988–1991)
- Munir Said Thalib, activist, founder of the "Kontras" human rights organization
- Novel Bamukmin, Islamic Defenders Front activist
- Thaha Alhamid, political and papuan rights activist, secretary general of the Papua Presidium Council
- Tsamara Amany Alatas, women's rights activist, founder of "Perempuan Politik" organization
- Yenny Wahid, Islamic activist, director of The Wahid Institute (Note: Abdurrahman Wahid writes that the Hasyim Asy'ari extended family were Arab descendants who had indigenize themselves with the native peoples. Furthermore, Abdurrahman mentioned that his extended family came from the al-Basyaiban clan (see Wahid 2010, pp. 25–28))

== Artists ==
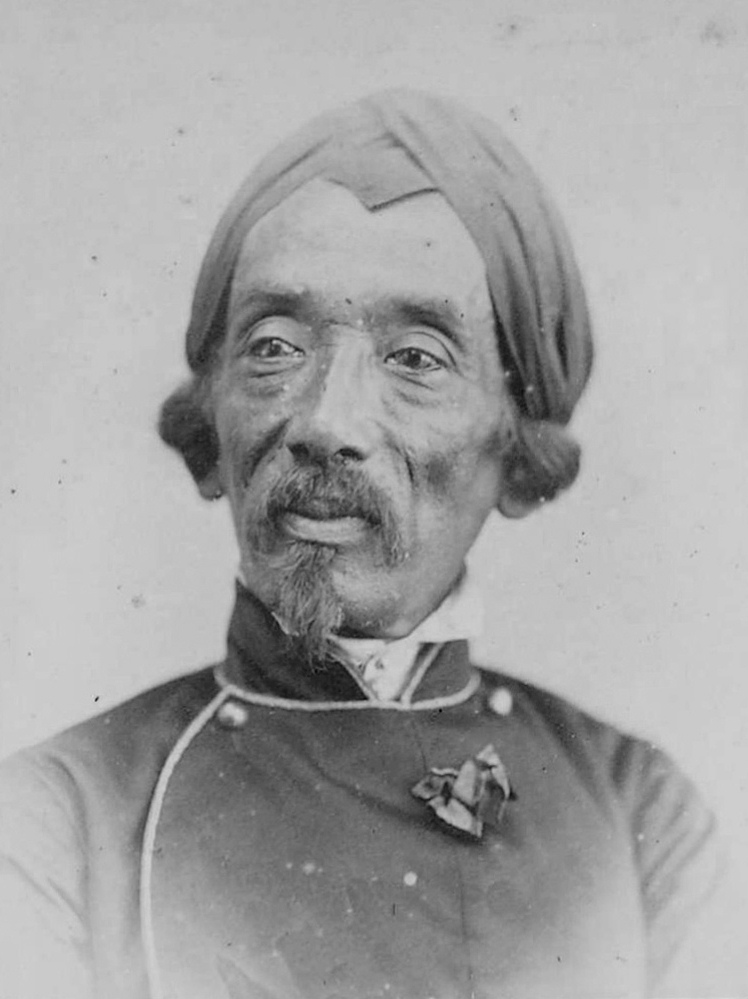
Raden Saleh

- Amang Rahman Zubair, painter
- Boy G. Sakti, choreographer (Note: Son of Gusmiati Suid (see Murgiyanto 2004))
- Gusmiati Suid, choreographer (Note: Arab Hadhrami father from Ba 'Alawi sada clan surnamed bin Shahab and Minangkabau mother (see Murgiyanto 2004))
- Kemal Jufri, photographer
- Marga Alam, fashion designer
- Raden Saleh, painter, pioneering Indonesian romantic painter
- Sayed Dahlan Al Habsyi, painter
- Vivi Zubedi, fashion designer
- Zaskia Sungkar, fashion designer, actress, and singer

== Authors ==
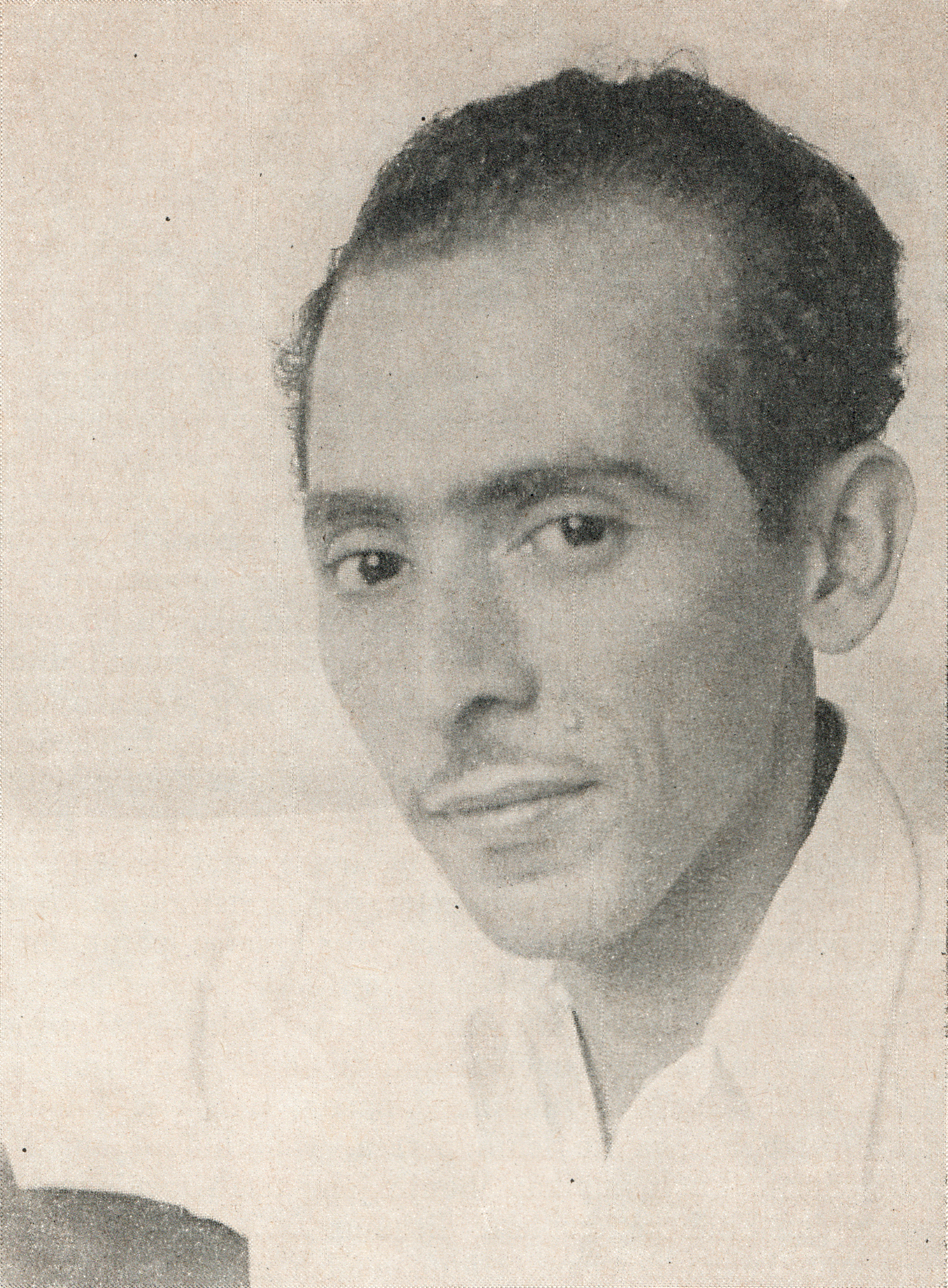
M. Balfas

- Agus R. Sarjono, poet and author
- Ali Ahmad Bakathir, playwright and poet
- Ali Audah, literature author
- Ben Sohib, novelist
- Haidar Bagir, author, the president director of the "Mizan Group" (Note: Haidar Bagir clan is Al-Habsyi)
- Hoesin Bafagih, author
- Husein Ja'far Al-Hadar, author, philosopher
- M. Balfas, writer and literary critic

== Businesspeople ==
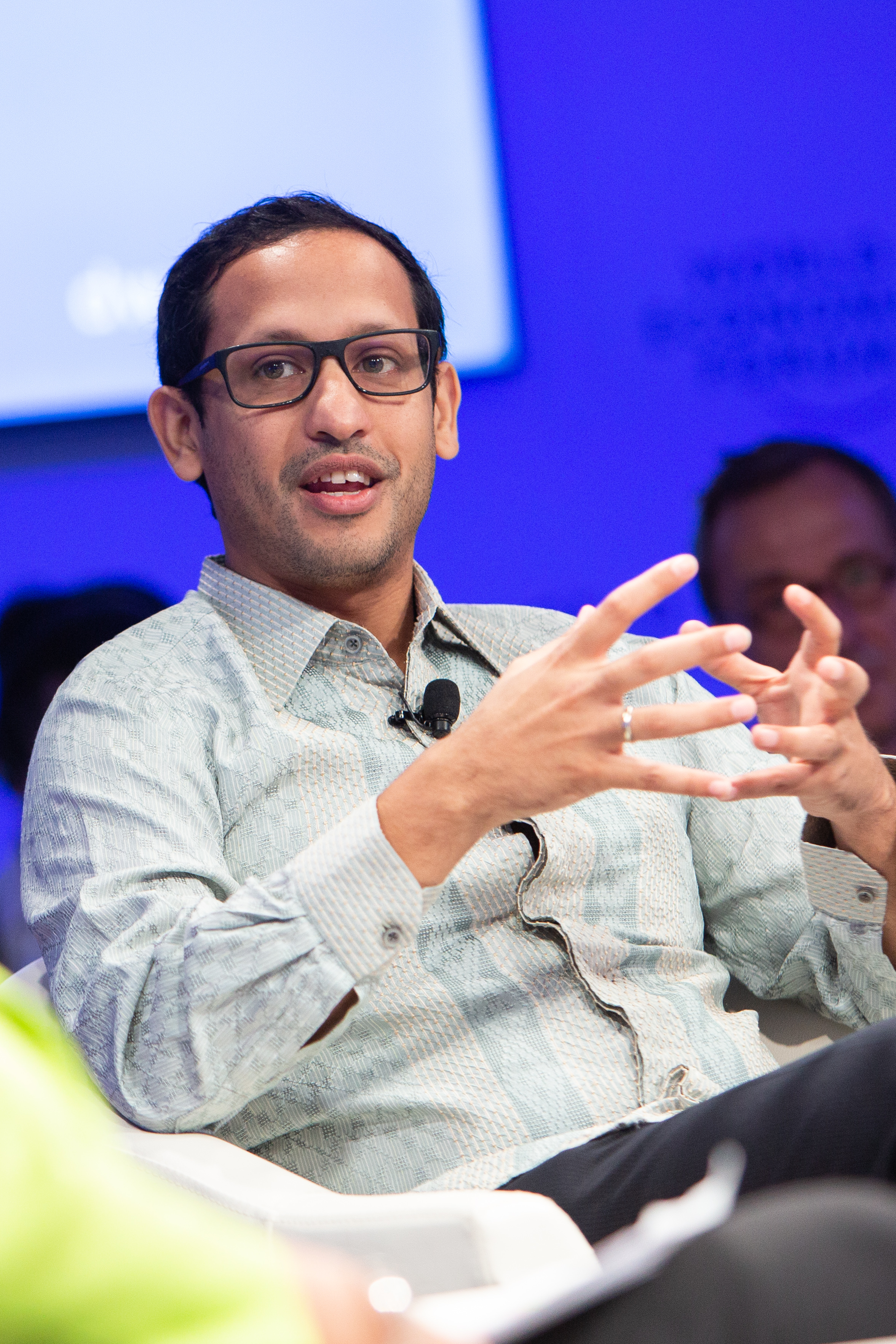
Nadiem Makarim

- Affi Assegaf, co-founder of "Female Daily Network"
- Ahmad Fahmy Alhady, businessman, founder of "Tanamur"
- Ala Alatas, owner of PT "Tifar Admanco"
- Faradj Martak, businessman, co-founder o N.V. Marba
- Gamal Albinsaid, social entrepreneur, CEO of "Indonesia Medika", founder of Garbage Clinical Insurance
- Hanifa Ambadar, co-founder and CEO of "Female Daily Network"
- Lukman Mahfoedz, president director and CEO of MedcoEnergi (2011–2015)
- Maher Algadri, conglomerate, "Kodel Group" entrepreneurs
- Mohammad Riza Chalid, businessman
- Nabilah Alsagoff, Singaporean-born businesswoman, founder of electronic payment service provider "DOKU Payment Gateway Indonesia"
- Nafisah Ahmad Zen Shahab, businesswomen
- Robby Djohan, president director of Garuda Indonesia (1998) (Note: Malays Arab father and Dutch Indonesian mother)
- Yusuf Muhammad Martak, vice president of Energi Mega Persada (2004–2012), businessman, Islamic activist, politician

== Celebrities ==
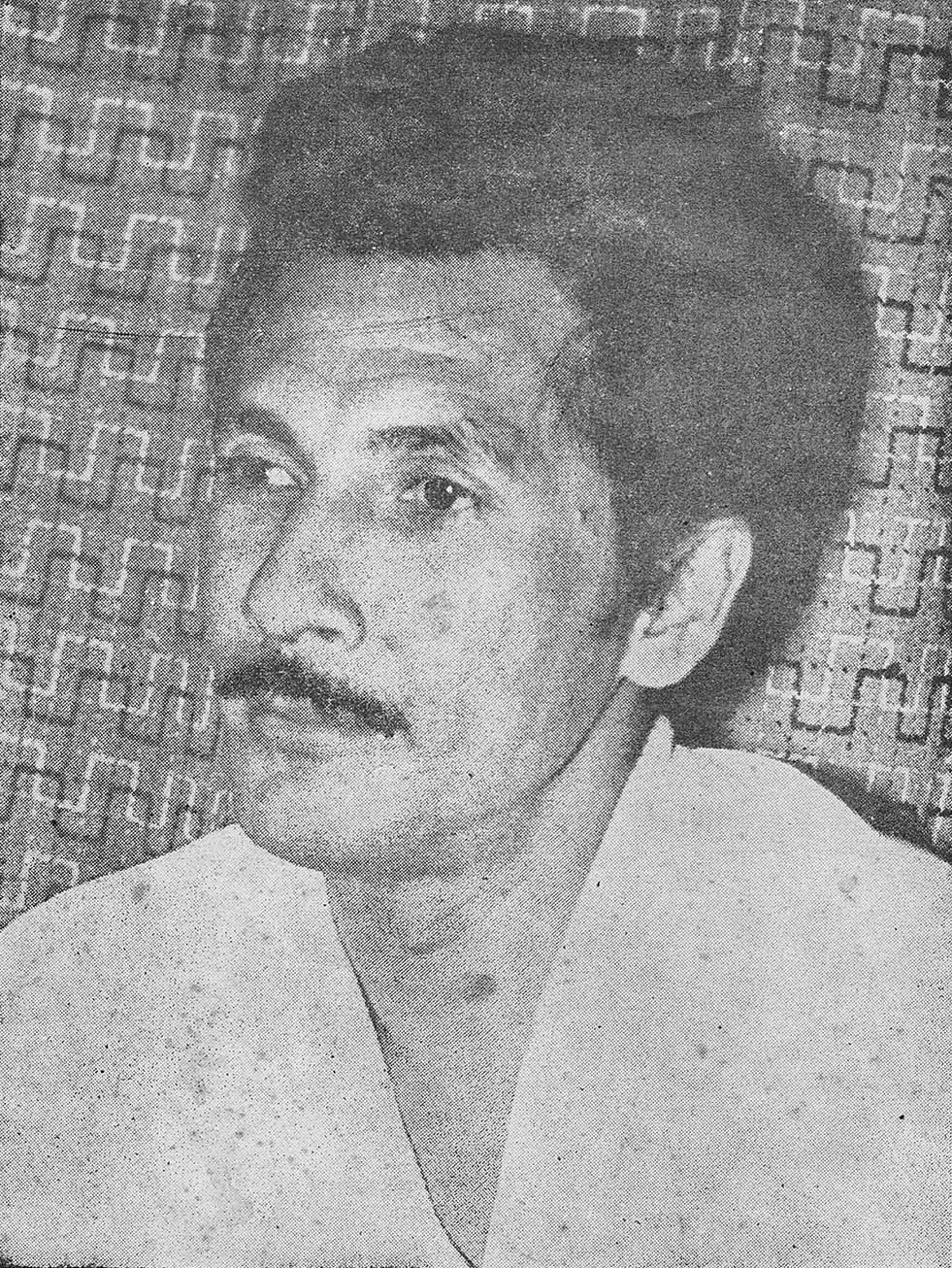
A.N. Alcaff

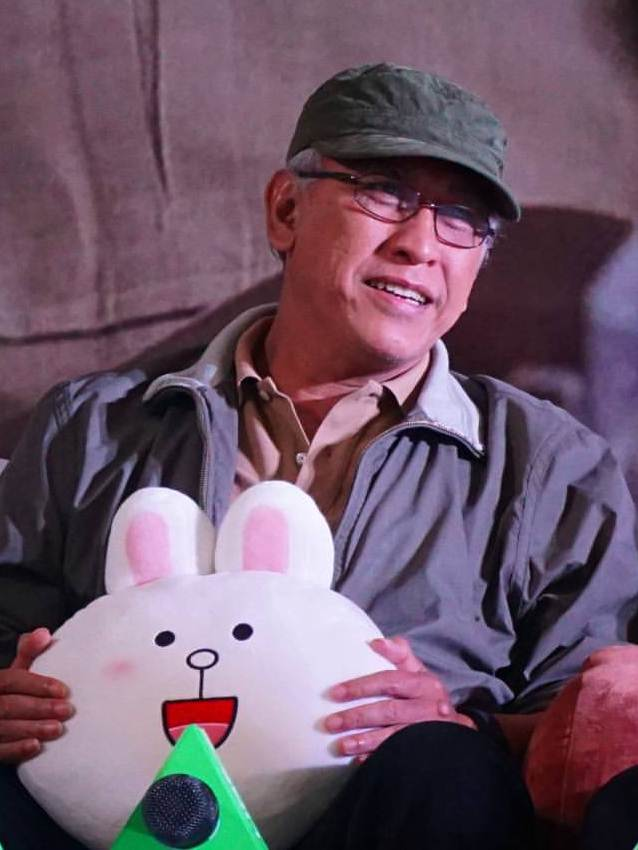
Iwan Fals

- A. N. Alcaff, actor and film director
- Abdul Malik Buzaid, music composer
- Ahmad Abdul, singer (Note: Ahmad Abdul clan is Baladjam)
- Ahmad Albar, rock singer, founding member of God Bless
- Alex Abbad, actor
- Ali Albar, singer and actor
- Ali Shahab, film director, screenwriter, journalist, and novelist
- Ali Syakieb, actor, model, politician (Note: Syakieb clan is Balweel)
- Aliando Syarief, actor, singer, and songwriter (Note: Aliando Syarief clan is Alkatiri)
- Alwi Oslan, actor, singer, and comedian (Note: Alwi Oslan clan is Alhabsyi)
- Alwi Assegaf, actor
- Aminah Cendrakasih, actress (Note: Arab Indonesian father and Chinese Javanese mother)
- Andi Soraya, actress (Note: Andi Soraya clan is Assegaf)
- Aaron Ashab, actor and singer
- Asyifa Latief, Miss Indonesia 2010
- Atiqah Hasiholan, actress (Note: Arab Hadhrami father from Ba 'Alawi sada clan surnamed Alhady and Batak mother)
- Aufa Assagaf, actor
- Bing Slamet, singer, songwriter, comedian, and actor (Note: Bing Slamet clan is Albar)
- Bucek Depp, model and actor
- Camelia Malik, actress and dangdut singer (Note: Minangkabau father and Arab Moroccan mother from Hashemites clan surnamed Al-Hasni)
- Christine Hakim, actress, film producer, and activist
- Fachrul Rozy, actor, scenario writer
- Fachri Albar, actor
- Fadil Jaidi, actor, singer, internet personality
- Fathir Muchtar, actor
- Fauzi Baadilla, Egyptian-born Indonesian actor and model, politician
- Haddad Alwi, nasheed singer (Note: Haddad Alwi clan is Assegaf)
- Husein Aidid, singer-songwriter
- Husein Alatas, singer
- Ismail Basbeth, film director
- Iwan Fals, singer-songwriter
- Jihane Almira Chedid, actress, model
- Muchsin Alatas, singer and actor
- Nabila Syakieb, actress
- Naysila Mirdad, actress
- Novia Bachmid, singer
- Omar Daniel, actor, presenter, and model (Note: Omar Daniel clan is Assegaf)
- Pierre Gruno, actor
- Refal Hady, actor
- Rio Reifan, actor
- Ridho Rhoma, singer and actor
- Rifky Balweel, actor
- Riza Shahab, actor
- Rizky Alatas, actor
- Rizky Nazar, actor
- S. Olvah Alhamid, Miss Eco Indonesia 2016
- Said Kelana, musician
- Sakdiyah Ma'ruf, stand-up comedian
- Shafira Umm, presenter, radio broadcaster, actress
- Shireen Sungkar, actress
- Shirin Al Athrus, Instagram influencer
- Syech Abidin, drummer
- Syech Albar, gambus singer
- Terry Shahab, singer
- Umar Lubis, actor
- Umay Shahab, actor, singer, presenter and model
- Veve Zulfikar, religious singer, actress, and brand ambassador
- Vicky Shu, singer
- Virzha, singer
- Zee Zee Shahab, actress

== Criminals ==
- Abdullah Sungkar, founder and leader of Jemaah Islamiyah, Islamist terrorist and separatist organization, imprisoned for alleged terrorism cases
- Abu Bakar Ba'asyir, founder and leader of Jamaah Ansharut Tauhid, imprisoned for alleged terrorism cases
- Husein Ali Alhabsyi, 1985 Borobudur bombing perpetrator, founder and president of Muslim Brotherhood of Indonesia (since 2001)
- Umar Patek, member of Jemaah Islamiyah who was wanted in the United States, Australia, and Indonesia on terrorism charges; 2002 Bali bombings perpetrator

== Freedom fighters and other historical figures ==
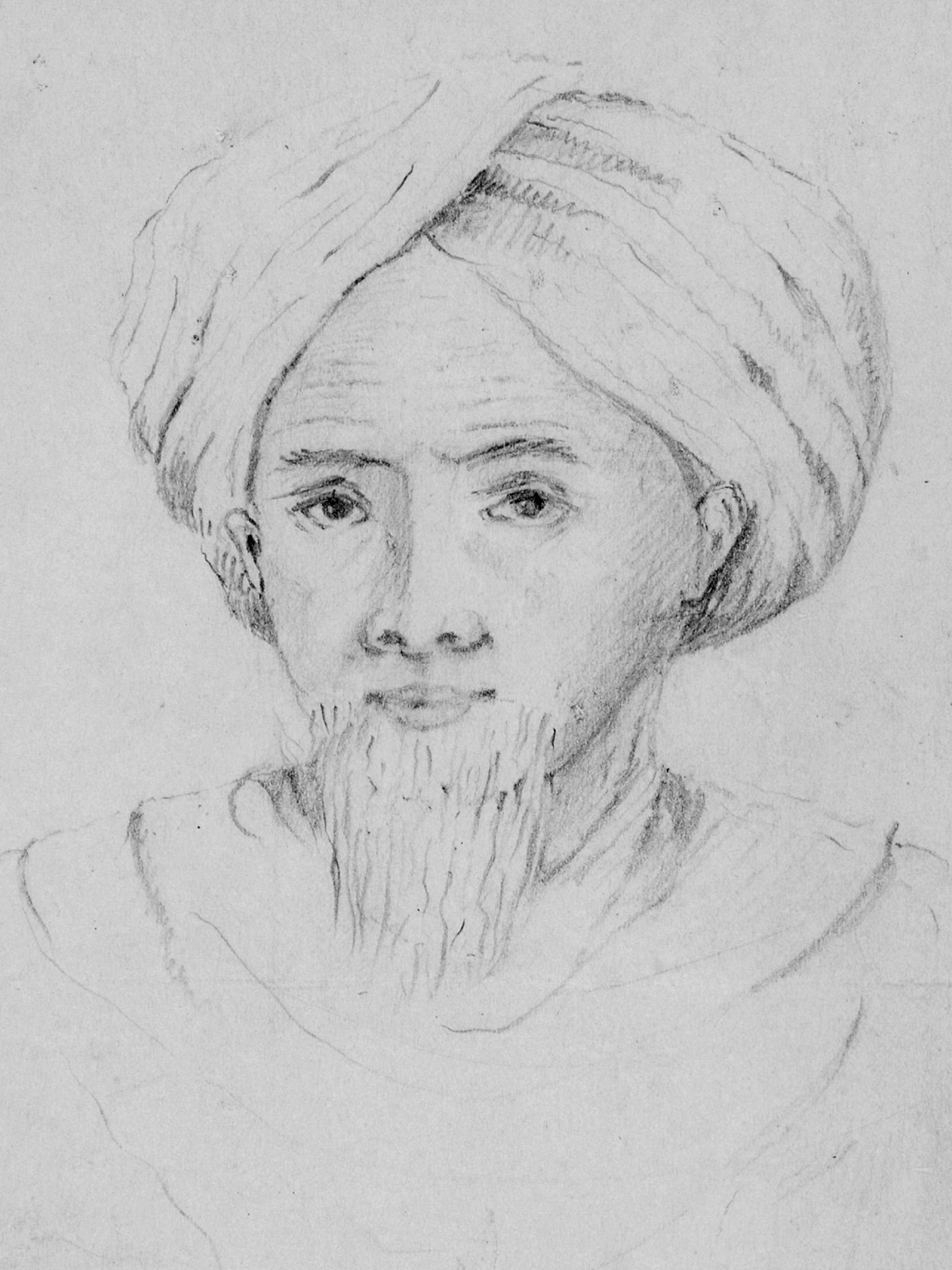
Imam Bonjol

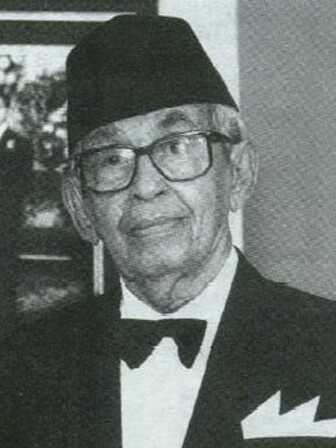
Hamid Algadri

- Abdullah bin Alwi Alatas, merchant and philanthropist, Pan-Islamism figure
- Abdurrahman Az-Zahir, leader of Aceh War
- Adipati Pringgoloyo, fighter, patih of Sumenep, regent of Probolinggo Regency (?–?), regent of Lasem (1817–1819) and Kudus Regency (1819–1820)
- Hamid Algadri, pioneer of freedom for Indonesian independence, revolutionary, member of Constitutional Assembly of Indonesia (1956–1959), member of DPR RI (1956–1959)
- Ibrahim Madiokusumo, Java War fighter
- Kertoboso Bustam, secretary of Dutch East India Company in Semarang
- Mahfudh Abdurrahman Al-Hasani, fighter, leader of "Angkatan Umat Islam"
- Raden Mas Sukur, Java War fighter
- Radin Inten II, National Hero of Indonesia
- Said Naum, Muslim philanthropist, The first Kapitan Arab of Batavia (1844–1864)
- Said Tjong Baadilla, Kapitan Arab in Banda Islands
- Surohadimenggolo V, fighters, "Sunan or Kanjeng Terboyo", regent of Semarang Regency (1802–1821)
- Sutomo, military leader during the Indonesian National Revolution, Battle of Surabaya fighter, National Hero of Indonesia
- Tabri Thamrin, scientists in the Dutch colonial era, wedana (regent's assistant) in Batavia, co-founder of Sarekat Priyayi
- Tuanku Imam Bonjol, leader of Padri War, National Hero of Indonesia

== Journalists ==
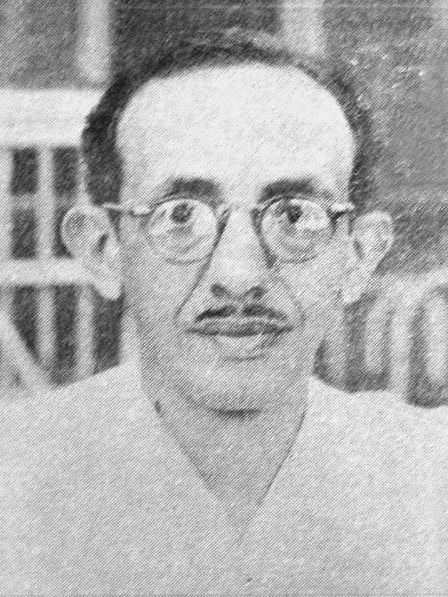
AR Baswedan

- Abdurrahman Baswedan, journalist, diplomat, and writer; National Hero of Indonesia; Deputy Minister of Information of Indonesia (1946–1947); member of Constitutional Assembly of Indonesia (1956–1959)
- Ahmad Taufik, newspaper journalist
- Alwi Shahab, journalist, writer
- Amelia Yachya, news anchor
- Asa Bafaqih, journalist, diplomat
- Asad Shahab, journalist, diplomat, historian, and writer
- Djafar Assegaff, journalist, diplomat, Indonesian ambassador to Vietnam (1993–1997)
- Fessy Alwi, news anchor
- Fikri Jufri, journalist, co-founder of Tempo
- Marializia Hasni, journalist, news anchor
- Harun Musawa, founding editor of "alKisah"
- Ismid Hadad, journalist, environmentalists
- Najla Hilabi, journalist, news anchor
- Najwa Shihab, journalist, news anchor
- Rahma Sarita, news anchor, politician
- Zackia Arfan, journalist, news anchor

== Military and police personnel ==
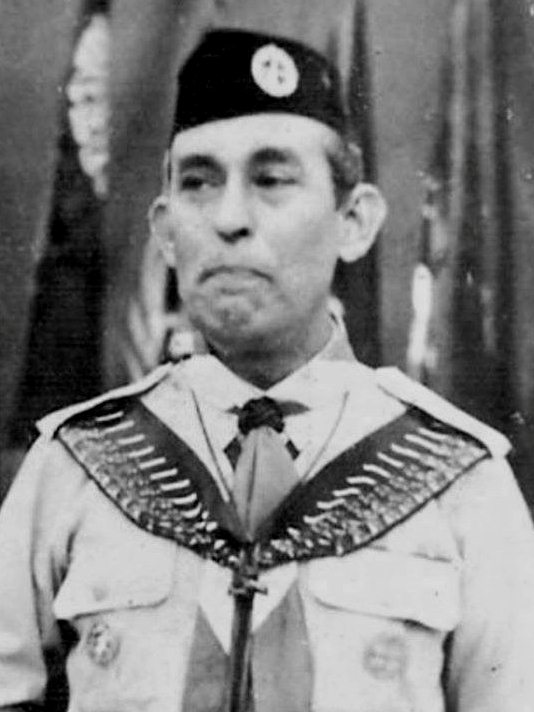
Husein Mutahar

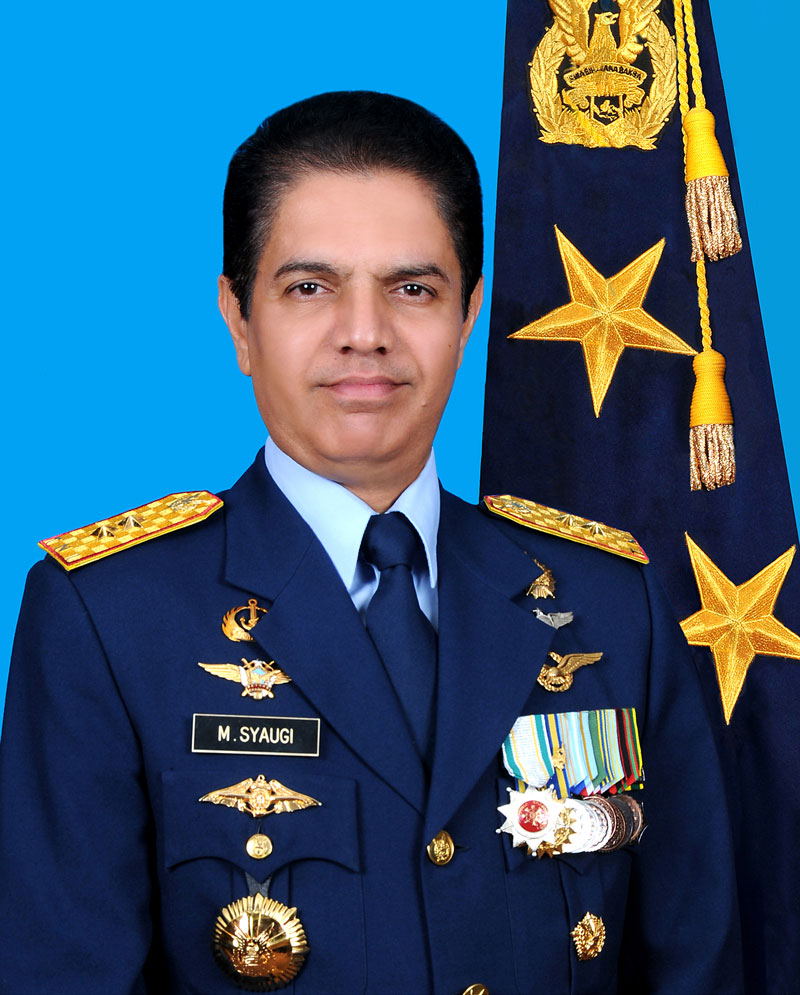
M. Syaugi

- Husein Hamidi, inspector general of Indonesian National Police, chief of Aceh Regional Police (2014–2016)
- Husein Mutahar, major of Indonesian Navy, fighters of the Indonesian National Revolution, founder of Paskibraka, Indonesian ambassador to Vatican (1969–1973)
- Kusworo Wibowo, police commissioner of Indonesian National Police, chief of Gresik Resort Police (2019–), chief of Jember Resort Police (2016–2019)
- Muchammad Richad, rear admiral of Indonesian Navy, commander of Main Naval Base III Jakarta (2017–2018), commander of Indonesian Navy Military Police (2015–2017)
- Muhammad Syaugi, air marshal of Indonesian Air Force, head of National Search and Rescue Agency (2017–2019), commander of Air Force Operational Commands I (2012–2014), commander of Iswahyudi Air Force Base (2011–2012)
- S. Mengga, Indonesian freedom fighters, colonel of Indonesian Army
- Saleh Basarah, air chief marshal of Indonesian Air Force, 6th chief of Staff of the Indonesian Air Force (1973–1977), member of Supreme Advisory Council (1983–?), Indonesian Ambassador to the United Kingdom (1978–1981)
- Saleh Saaf, brigadier general of Indonesian National Police, chief of Yogyakarta Regional Police (2001), chief of South Sulawesi Regional Police (2004–2005)
- Zacky Anwar Makarim, major general of Indonesian Army, director of the Intelligence Service of the Indonesian Army (1997–1999)
- Zeky Ambadar, air vice-marshal of Indonesian Air Force, commander of Indonesian National Air Defense Forces Command (2001–2002), commandant of Indonesian Air Force Command and Staff College (2000–2001)

== Politicians ==
=== Central government ===
==== President ====
- Abdurrahman Wahid, 4th president of Indonesia (1999–2001), general chairman of Nahdlatul Ulama (1984–1999)
- B. J. Habibie, 3rd president of Indonesia (1998–1999), 7th vice president of Indonesia (1998), 4th State Minister for Research and Technology of Indonesia (1978–1998) (Note: According to Simanjuntak 2008, p. xii, Habibie was an Arab descendant. Furthermore, Sinansari 1999, p. 14 gave more details on the origins of the Habibie family. According to him, Habibie was an Arab-Gorontalo-Bugis descendant from his father, and Javanese from his mother)

==== Cabinet-level officers ====
- Abdul Rahman Saleh, Attorney General of Indonesia (2004–2007), Indonesian ambassador to Denmark (2008–2011)
- Abdulmutalib Danuningrat, Minister of Sea Transportation (1959–1963), Indonesian ambassador to Sweden (1964–1967)
- Abdurrahman Mohammad Fachir, Deputy Minister of Foreign Affairs (2014–2019)
- Ali Alatas, Minister of Foreign Affairs (1988–1999), chairman of Presidential Advisory Council (2007–2008)
- Alwi Shihab, Coordinating Minister for People's Welfare of Indonesia (2004–2005), Minister of Foreign Affairs (1999–2001)
- Ferry Mursyidan Baldan, Minister of Agrarian Affairs and Spatial Planning (2014–2016)
- Fuad Bawazier, Ministers of Finance (1998)
- Fuad Hassan, Minister of Education and Culture (1985–1993), Indonesian Ambassador to Egypt (1976–1980)
- Marie Muhammad, Ministers of Finance (1993–1998)
- Muhammad Dahlan, Minister of Religious Affairs (1967–1973), pioneer of Musabaqah Tilawatil Quran
- Nabiel Makarim, Minister of Environment (2001–2004)
- Nadiem Makarim, Minister of Education and Culture (2019–2024), founder of Gojek
- Said Agil Husin Al Munawar, Minister of Religious Affairs (2001–2004), rector of Jamiat Kheir Islamic Institute (1997)
- Saleh Afiff, Coordinating Minister for Economy, Finance, Industry and Development Supervision (1993–1998), State Minister of National Development Planning (1988–1993), Minister of Administrative and Bureaucratic Reform (1983–1988)
- Salim Segaf Al-Jufri, Minister of Social Affairs (2009–2014), Consultative Board Chairman of Prosperous Justice Party (2015–)
- Wahid Hasyim, Minister of Religious Affairs (1945–1945, 1949–1950, 1950–1952), National Hero of Indonesia

==== Members of central parliamentary houses ====
- Abdillah Toha, DPR RI member from PAN (2004–2009)
- Abdul Hakim Bafagih, DPR RI member from PAN (2019–)
- Aboe Bakar Al-Habsyi, DPR RI member from PKS (2009–)
- Abdurrahman Abubakar Bahmid, DPD RI member (2014–), former PKS politician
- Abdurrahman Bahasyim, DPD RI member (2014–), former PD politician
- Adilla Aziz, DPD RI member (2019–)
- Ahmad Nizar Shihab, DPR RI member from PD (2009–2014)
- Ali Alwi, DPD RI member (2014–), former PKB politician
- Djafar Alkatiri, DPD RI member (2019–)
- Djamal Aziz, DPR RI member from Hanura (2009–2014)
- Fadel Muhammad, Deputy Speaker of the MPR RI (2019–), DPR RI member from Golkar (2014–2019), Minister of Maritime Affairs and Fisheries (2009–2011), Governor of Gorontalo (2001–2009)
- Fahmy Alaydroes, DPR RI member from PKS (2019–)
- Farouk Muhammad, Deputy Speaker of the DPD RI (2014–2019)
- Hamid Abdullah, DPD RI member (2009–)
- Hana Hasanah Shahab, DPD RI member (2014–2019), PPP politician
- Jamal Mirdad, DPR RI member from Gerindra (2009–2019), singer, actor
- Mustofa Assegaf, DPR RI member from PPP (2009–2019)
- Nabiel Al Musawa, DPR RI member from PKS (2009–2014)
- Nurdin Halid, DPR RI member from Golkar (1999–2004), general chairman of Football Association of Indonesia (2003–2011)
- Nurhayati Ali Assegaf, DPR RI member from PD (2009–2019)
- Rudy Mas'ud, DPR RI member from Golkar (2019–)
- Said Abdullah, DPR RI member from PDI-P (2004–)
- Said Abdurrahman, DPD RI member (2019–)
- Said Akhmad Fawzy Zain Bachsin, DPD RI member (2009–2014), PPP politician
- Shaleh Muhamad Aldjufri, DPD RI member (2009–2014, 2015–)
- Sakinah Aljufri, DPR RI member from PKS (2019–)
- Salim S. Mengga, DPR RI member from PD (2009–2014), NasDem politician
- Sayed Abubakar A. Assegaf, DPR RI member from PD (2014–2019)
- Sayed Fuad Zakaria, DPR RI member from Golkar (2009–2014), speaker of the People's Representative Council of Aceh (2004–2009), Berkarya politician
- Sayed Muhammad Muliady, DPR RI member from PDI-P (2009–2014)
- Sayed Mustafa Usab, DPR RI member from PAN (2009–2014), PKB politician
- Syarif Abdullah Alkadrie, DPR RI member from Nasdem (2014–)
- Usamah Muhammad Al Hadar, DPR RI member from PPP (2004–2009)
- Zakaria Bahasyim, DPD RI member (2019–)

==== Independent agencies and commissions officers ====
- Husain Abdullah, spokesperson for the vice president of Indonesia (2014–2019)
- Muhammad Alhamid, chairman of Election Supervisory Board (2012–2017), professor of political science of Hasanuddin University
- Novel Baswedan, former Corruption Eradication Commission investigator, police commissioner of Indonesian National Police (–2014)
- Sofyan Basir, president director of Perusahaan Listrik Negara (2014–2019)

=== Provincial government ===
==== Governors and Vice Governors ====
- Aladin S. Mengga, Vice Governor of West Sulawesi (2011–2016)
- Anies Baswedan, Governor of Jakarta (2017–2022), Minister of Education and Culture (2014–2016), rector of Paramadina University (2007–2015)
- Ismeth Abdullah, Governor of Riau Islands (2005–2010)
- Ibrahim Hassan, Governor of Aceh (1986–1993), State Minister of Food and Horticulture (1993–1995)
- Musa Rajekshah, Vice Governor of North Sumatera (2018–)
- Said Assagaff, Governor of Maluku (2014–2019)
- Said Ismail, Vice Governor of Central Kalimantan (2016–2021)
- Wan Abubakar, Governor of Riau (2008), DPR RI member from PPP (2009–2014)
- Wan Thamrin Hasyim, Governor of Riau (2018–2019), Vice Governor of Riau (2017–2018), Regent of Rokan Hilir Regency (2001–2006)

==== Members of provincial parliament ====
- Iskandar Usman Al-Farlaky, DPR Aceh member from Aceh Party (2014–)
- Muhamad bin Salim Alatas, Jakarta DPRD member from PAN (2019–), Islamic scholar
- Quatly Abdulkadir Alkatiri, Deputy Speaker of the Central Java DPRD (2019–)
- Sayed Junaidi Rizaldi, Riau DPRD member from Hanura (2018–2019)
- Teuku Raja Keumangan, DPR Aceh member from Golkar (2019–)
- Wanda Hamidah, Jakarta DPRD member from PAN (2009–2014), NasDem politician, activist, actress

=== Municipal government ===
- Abdul Gafur Mas'ud, regent of Penajam North Paser Regency(2018–)
- Abdullah Abu Bakar, mayor of Kediri City
- Abdullah Assagaf, regent of North Maluku Regency (1994–1999), initiator of North Maluku, colonel of Indonesian Army
- Aji Raden Sayid Mohammad, mayor of Balikpapan (1960–1963), MPR RI member from Golkar (1977–1982)
- Danoesoegondo, regent of Magelang Regency (1908–1939)
- Faida, regent of Jember Regency (2016–2021)
- Hadi Zainal Abidin, mayor of Probolinggo (2019–2024)
- Muhammad Basyir Ahmad Syawie, mayor of Pekalongan (2005–2015)
- Rahmad Mas'ud, vice-mayor of Balikpapan (2016–)
- Sayed Jafar Al-Idrus, regent of Kotabaru Regency (2016–)
- Teuku Zulkarnaini, regent of Nagan Raya Regency (2007–2017)

=== Others ===
- Fachrul Baraqbah, PKI politician
- Ismail Alatas, member of Volksraad (1935–1944)
- Mohammad Husni Thamrin, member of Volksraad (1927–1941), political thinker, National Hero of Indonesia
- S. A. Sofyan, PKI politician
- Saleh Sungkar, Masyumi Party politician
- Syed Jaafar Albar, Malaysian politician (born in Indonesia)
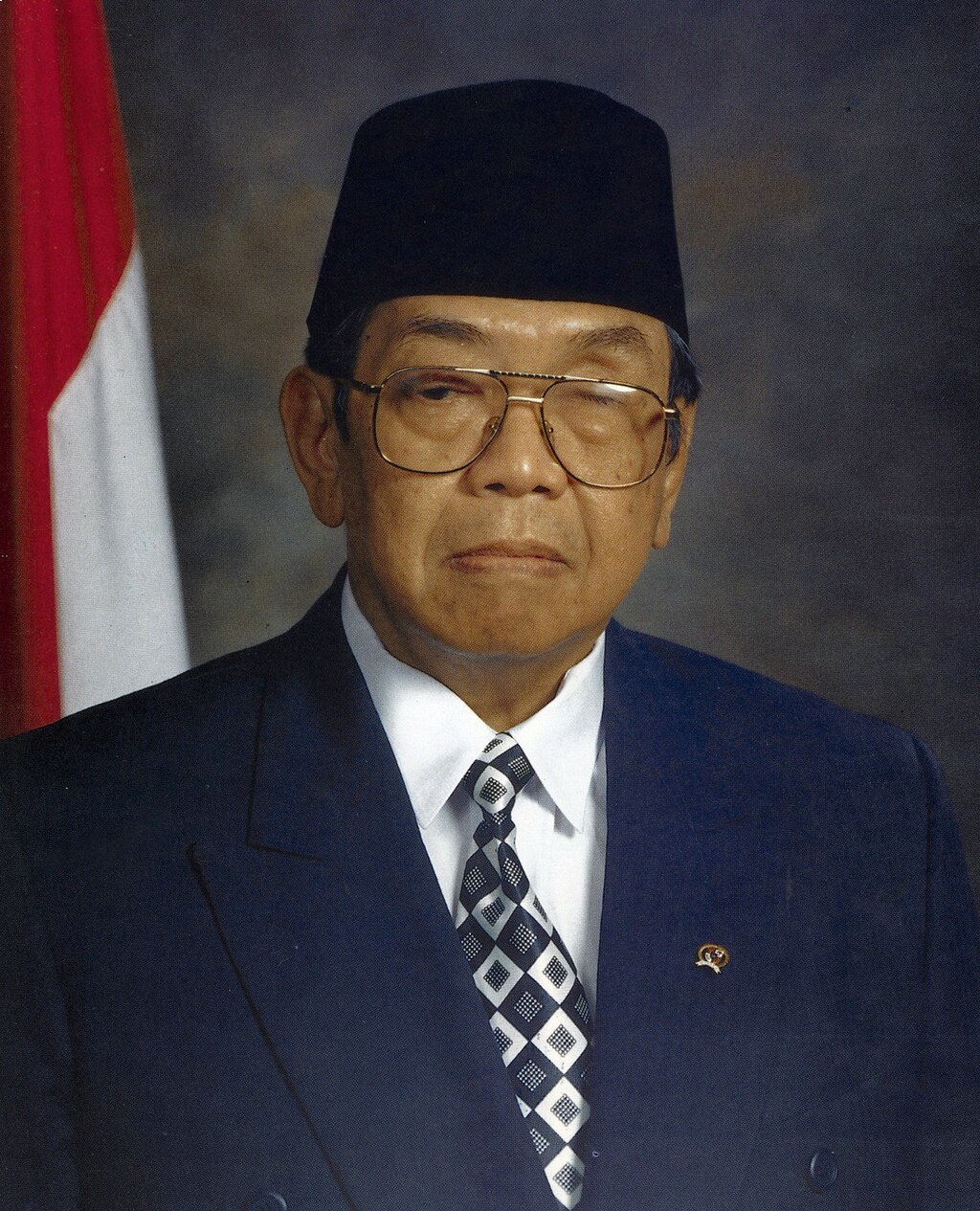
Abdurrahman Wahid

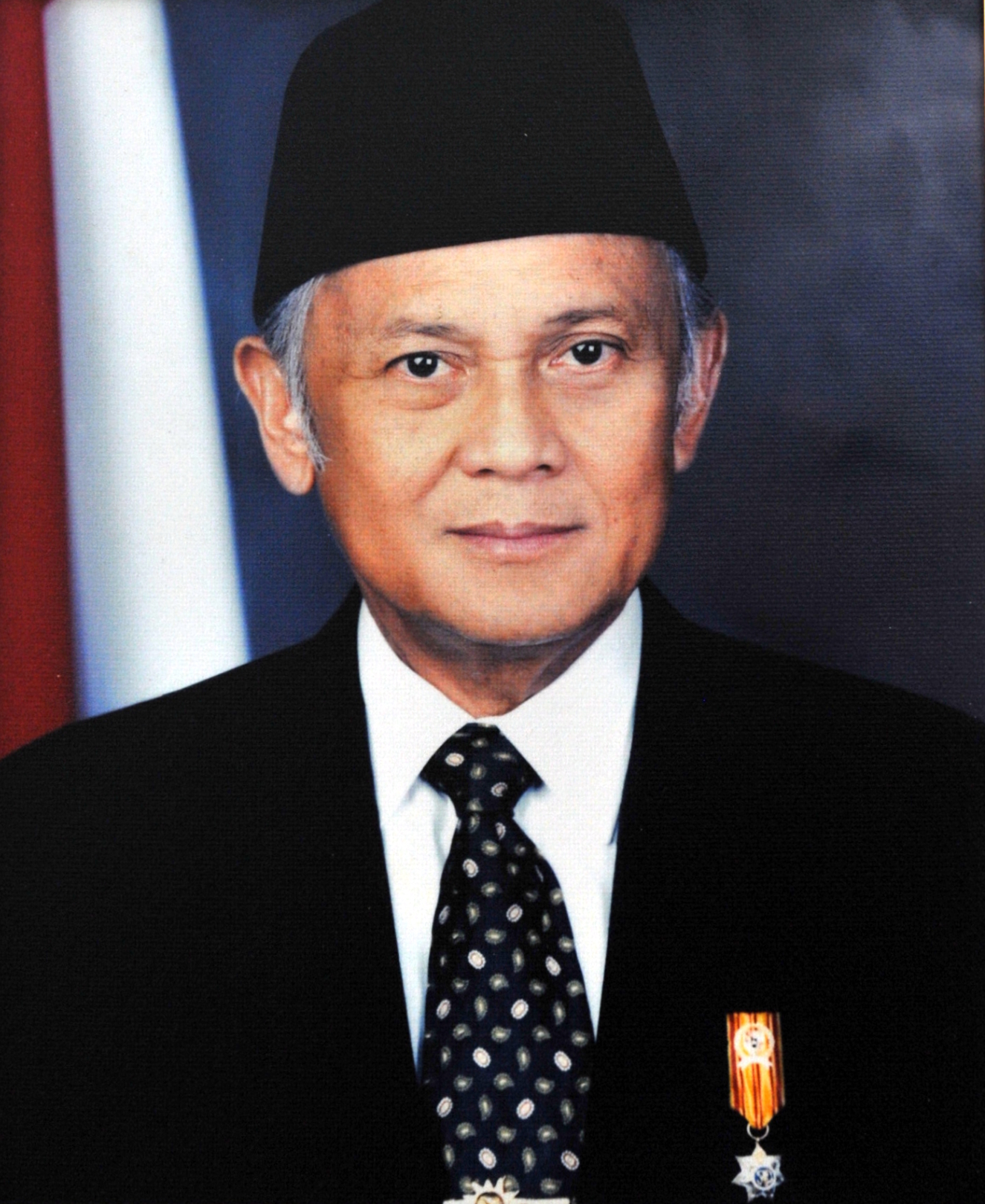
B. J. Habibie

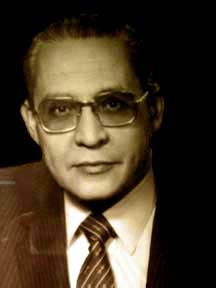
Ali Alatas

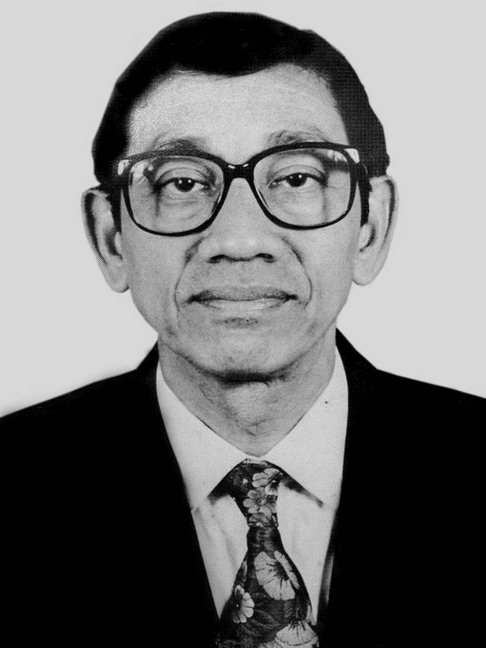
Marie Muhammad

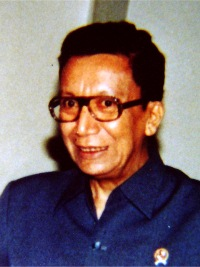
Saleh Afiff

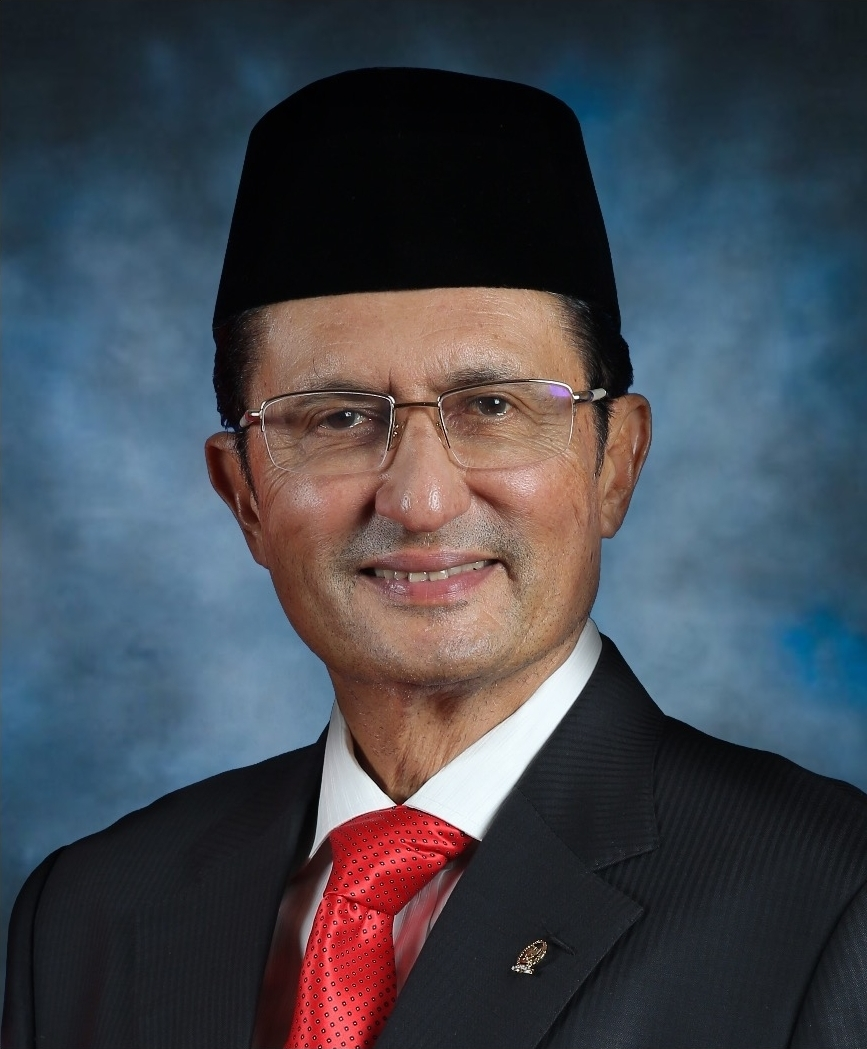
Fadel Muhammad

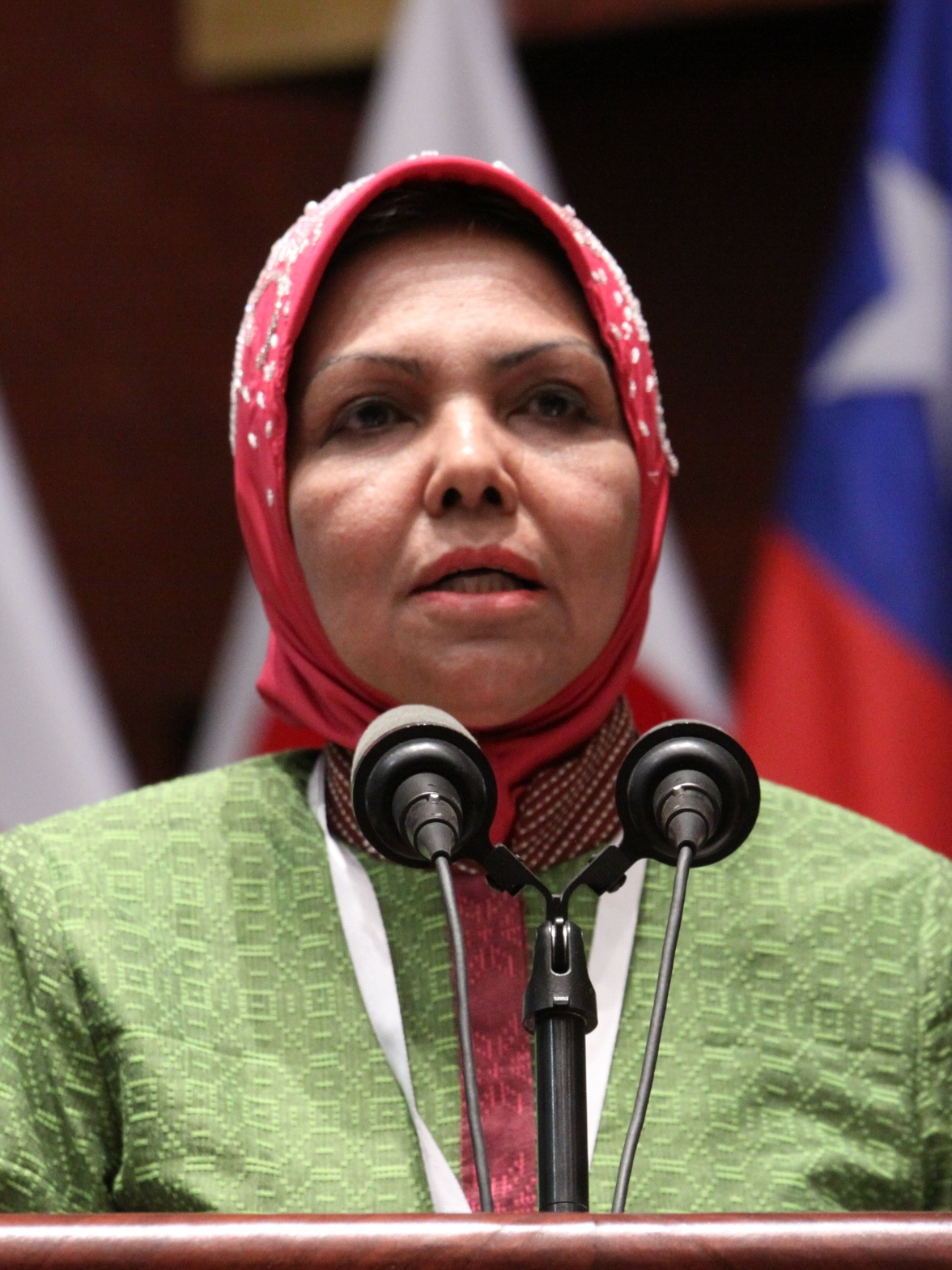
Nurhayati Assegaf

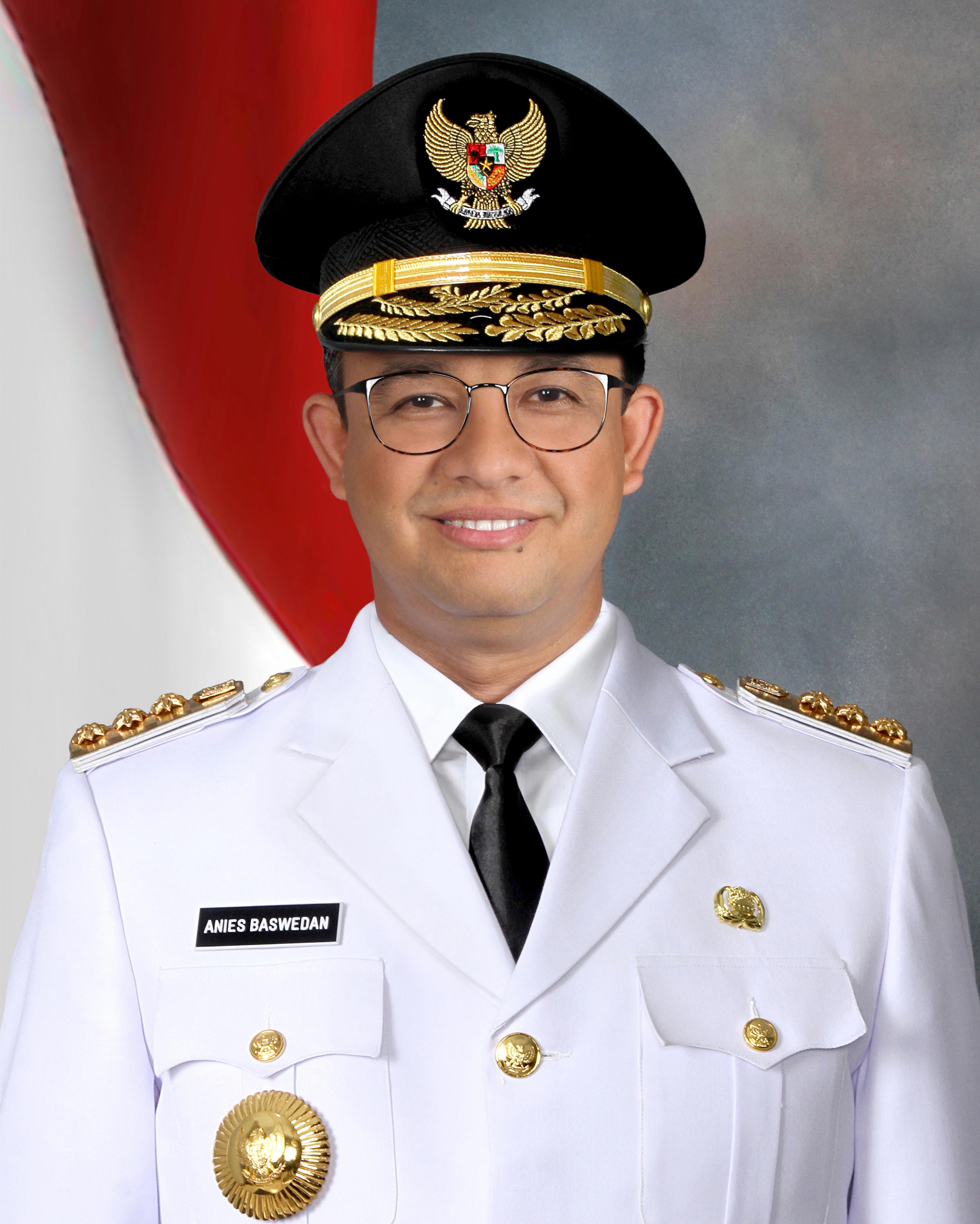
Anies Baswedan

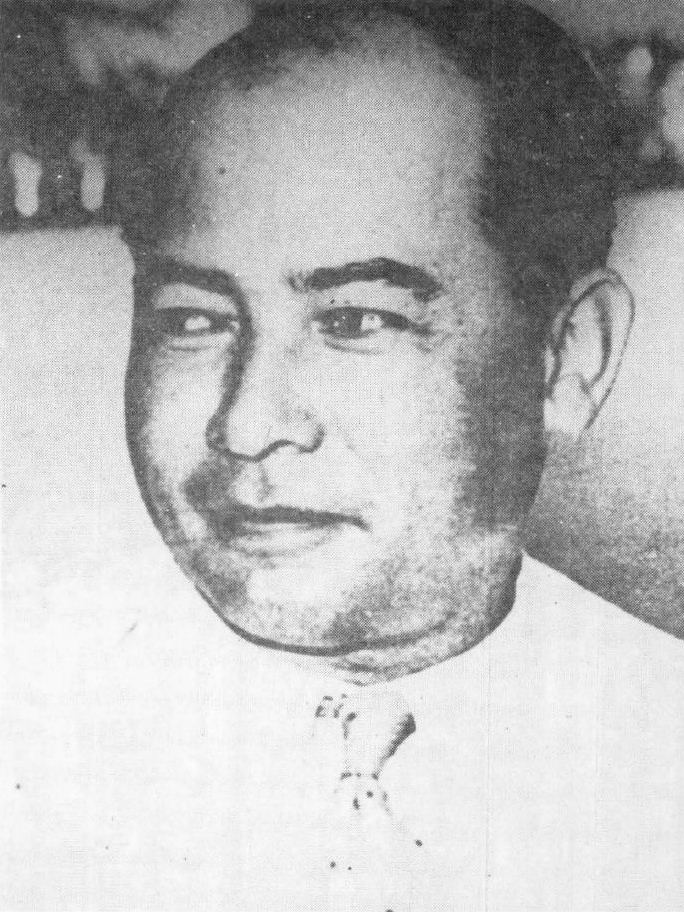
M. H. Thamrin

== Religious figures ==
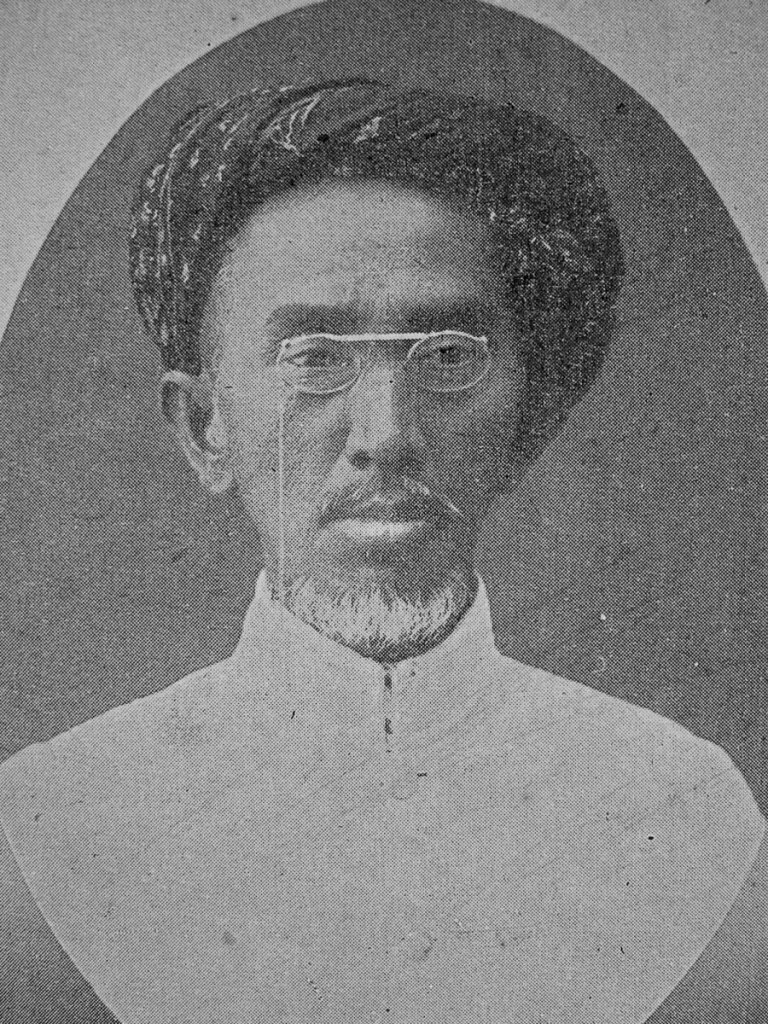
Ahmad Dahlan

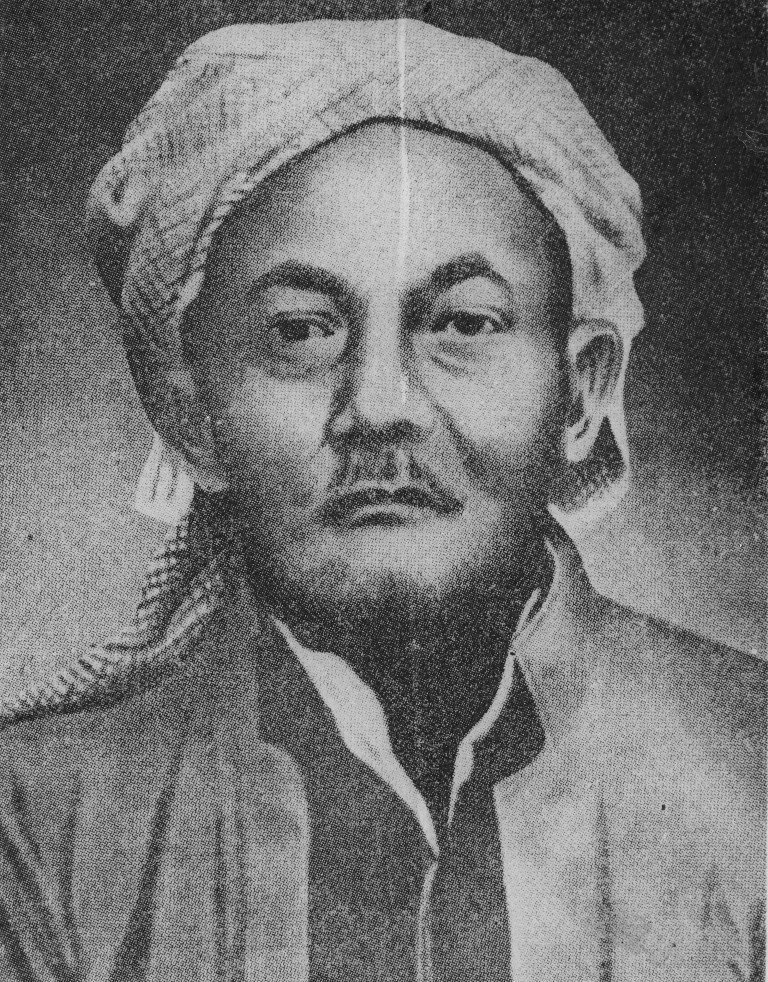
Hasyim Asy'ari

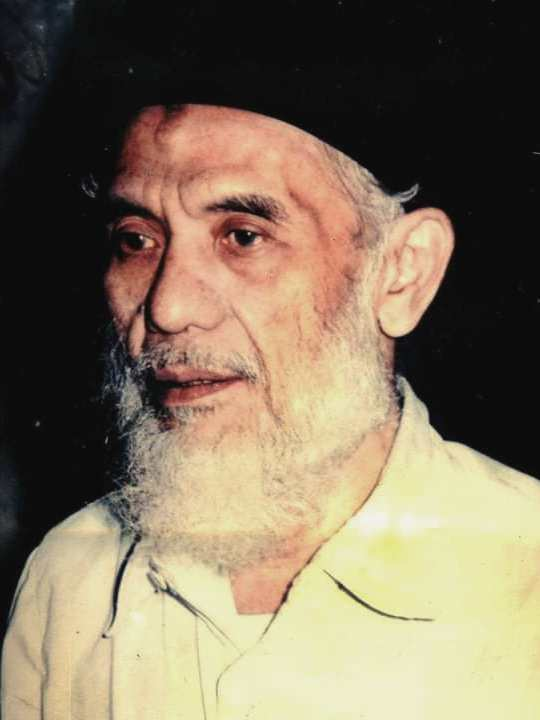
M. Dimyati al-Bantani

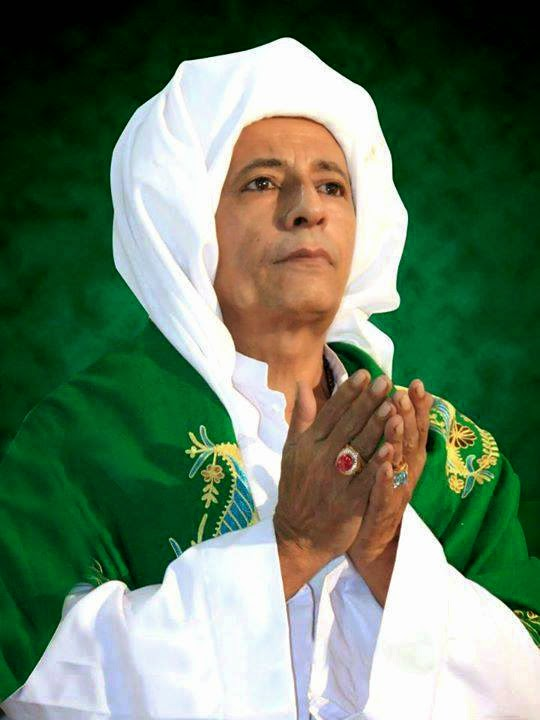
M. Luthfi bin Yahya

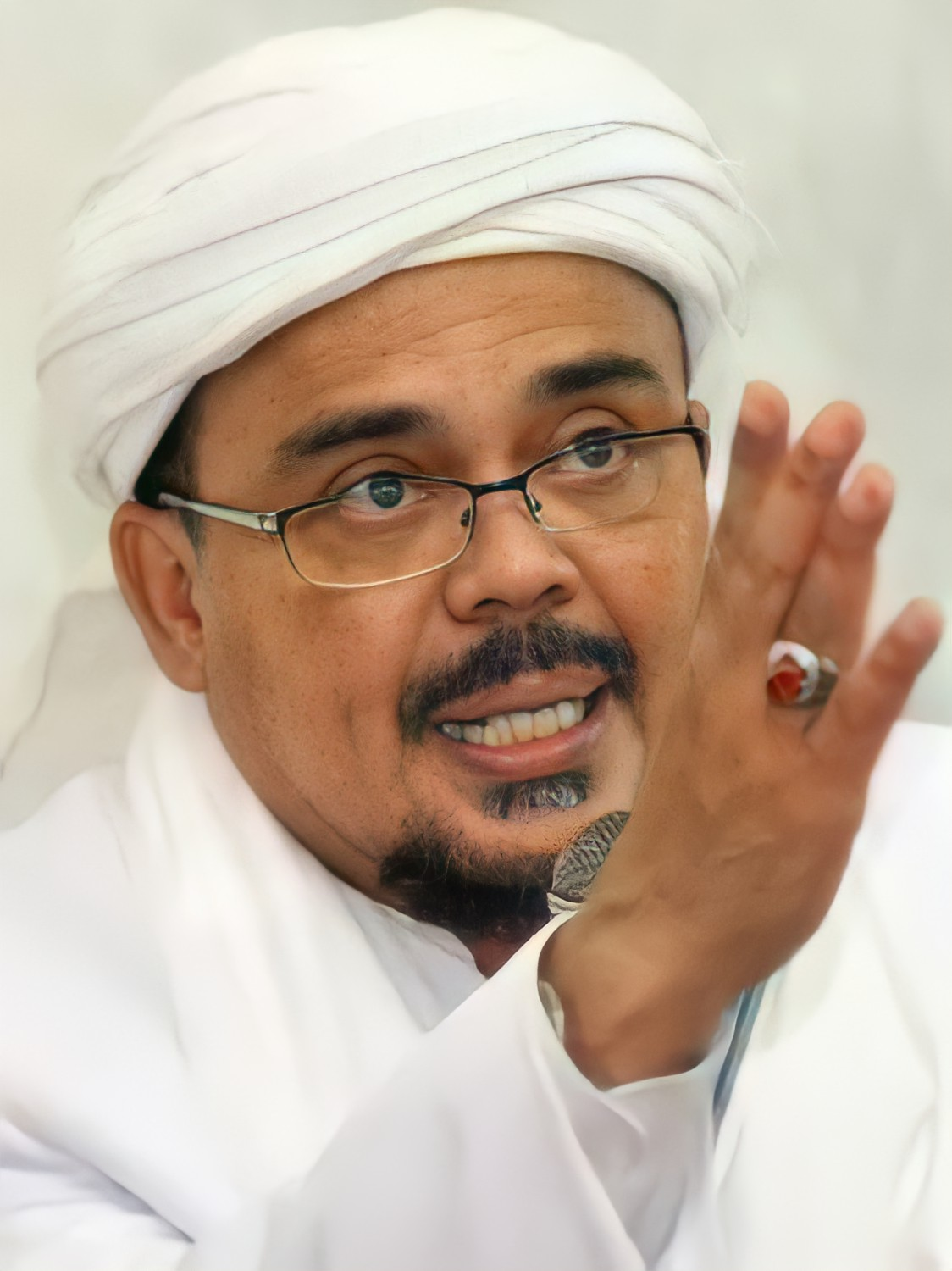
M. Rizieq Shihab

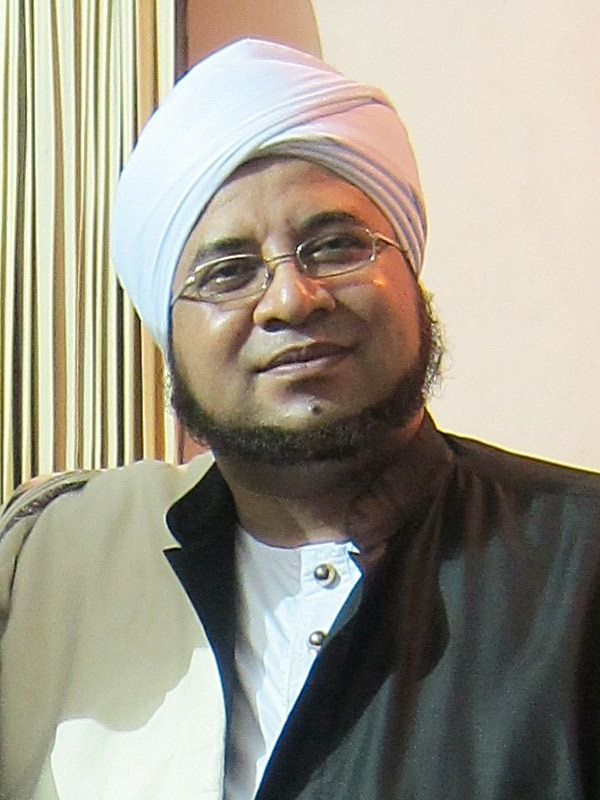
Munzir Al-Musawa

- Abdul Karim al-Bantani, Islamic cleric, murshid of Qadiriyya wa Naqshbandiyya sufi order
- Abdul Samad al-Palimbani, most prominent and influential Malay religious scholar of the 18th century from Palembang, the author of many kitab kuning
- Abdullah ibn Shaykh al-Aydarus, a religious leader in Aceh Sultanate, the ancestor of Bendahara dynasty
- Abubakar bin Ali Shahab, habib, founder of Jamiat Kheir
- Ahmad Alhabsyi, ustad, habib, Islamic preacher on television
- Ahmad Dahlan, founder of Muhammadiyah, Muslim reformers, National Hero of Indonesia
- Ahmad Muhtadi Dimyathi, influential Muslim cleric in Banten, leader of Pondok Pesantren Cidahu
- Ahmad Shabri Lubis, Islamic cleric, chairman of the Islamic Defenders Front (2015–)
- Ahmad Shiddiq, Islamic cleric, supreme leader (Rais Aam) of Nahdlatul Ulama (1984–1991)
- Ahmad Surkati, founder of Al-Irshad Al-Islamiya, Muslim reformers
- Ali Ahmad Shahab, habib, co-founder of Jamiat Kheir, co-founder of Al-Rabithah al-Alawiyyah
- Ali bin Abdurrahman al-Habsyi, habib, founder and chairman of the Majelis Taklim Kwitang
- Ali bin Husein Al-Attas, habib, spreader of Islam in the 20th century in Jakarta
- Alwi bin Thohir al-Haddad, habib, mufti of Johor Sultanate, co-founder of Al-Rabithah al-Alawiyyah
- Anis bin Alwi al-Habsyi, habib, influential Muslim cleric in Surakarta
- Arsyad Thawil al-Bantani, Islamic crelic, Cilegon War fighter
- Bahar bin Smith, habib, founder of Majelis Pembela Rasulullah
- Datuk Kahfi, spreader of Islam in the 15th century in Cirebon Sultanate, ancestor of Sultan of Sumedang Larang
- Habib Muda Seunagan, Islamic cleric, fighter, murshid of Shattari sufi order
- Hasan bin Ja'far Assegaf, habib, founder of Majelis Nurul Musthofa
- Hasan bin Muhammad Al Haddad, also known as "Mbah Priok", Habib and spreader of Islam in the 18th century Java
- Hasan Gipo, general chairman of Nahdlatul Ulama (1926–1952)
- Hasanuddin Qurotul Ain, spreader of Islam in the 15th century in Karawang
- Hasyim Asy'ari, founder of Nahdlatul Ulama, founder and leader of Pondok Pesantren Tebuireng, National Hero of Indonesia
- Husein bin Abubakar Alaydrus, habib, spreader of Islam in the 18th century in Jakarta
- Ibrahim Asmarakandi, spreader of Islam in the 15th century in Java
- Idrus bin Salim Al-Jufri, habib, founder of Alkhairaat
- Jafar Sadek, spreader of Islam in the 13th century in Maluku Islands, the ancestor of Islamic kings in Maluku (Ternate, Tidore, Jailolo, Bacan)
- Jindan Novel Jindan, habib, Islamic preacher
- Mas Alwi Abdul Aziz, Islamic cleric, Nahdlatul Ulama figure
- Mas Mansoer, Muslim reformers, general chairman of Muhammadiyah (1937–1942), National Hero of Indonesia
- Muhammad bin Yahya, habib, mufti of Kutai Sultanate
- Muhammad Dimyati al-Bantani, influential Muslim cleric in Banten, founder and leader of Pondok Pesantren Cidahu
- Muhammad Kholil al-Bangkalani, Islamic cleric, the author of many kitab kuning
- Muhammad Luthfi bin Yahya, habib, general chairman of the Jam’iyyah Ahli Thariqah Al-Mu’tabarah Al-Nahdliyah (2000–)
- Muhammad Nawawi al-Bantani, Islamic cleric, the author of many kitab kuning, imam of Masjid al-Haram in the 19th century
- Muhammad Rizieq Shihab, habib; founder, high priest (2013–), and chairman (1998–2013) of the Islamic Defenders Front
- Muhsin Ahmad Alatas, habib, chairman of the Islamic Defenders Front (2013–2015), politician
- Munzir Al-Musawa, habib, founder of Majelis Rasulullah
- Novel bin Muhammad Alaydrus, habib, Islamic preacher
- Nuruddin ar-Raniri, spreader of Islam in the 17th century in the Aceh Sultanate
- Saggaf bin Muhammad Aljufri, habib, supreme head of Alkhairaat (1974–), rector of Alkhairaat University (1967–1989)
- Said Aqil Siradj, Islamic scholar, general chairman of Nahdlatul Ulama (2010–)
- Salahuddin Wahid, leader of Pondok Pesantren Tebuireng
- Salim bin Djindan, habib, spreader of Islam in the 20th century in Jakarta
- Sayyid Sulaiman, habib, spreader of Islam in the 18th century in Java, founder of Pondok Pesantren Sidogiri Assegaf, habib, leader of Majelis Ahbabul Musthofa
- Sheikh Ali Jaber, Islamic scholar and preacher
- Tubagus Ahmad Bakri as-Sampuri, influential Muslim cleric in Purwakarta Regency
- Usman bin Yahya, habib, mufti of Batavia

== Royal figures ==
=== Java ===
- Maulana Hasanuddin, 1st Sultan of Banten (1552–1570), spreader of Islam in the 16th century in Banten
- Maulana Yusuf, 2nd sultan of Banten (1570–1585)
- Maulana Muhammad, 3rd sultan of Banten (1585–1596)
- Abu al-Mafakhir, 4th sultan of Banten (1596–1647)
- Abu al-Ma'ali Ahmad, 5th sultan of Banten (1647–1651)
- Tirtayasa, 6th sultan of Banten (1651–1683), National Hero of Indonesia
- Abu an-Nasr, 7th sultan of Banten (1683–1687)
- Aliyuddin I, 13th sultan of Banten (1773–1799)
- Ishaq Zainulmuttaqin, 15th sultan of Banten (1801–1802)
- Aliyuddin II, 16th sultan of Banten (1803–1808)
- Maulana Muhammad Shafiuddin, 17th sultan of Banten (1809–1813)
- Hendra Bambang Wisanggeni, 18th sultan of Banten (2016–)
- Arief Natadiningrat, 14th sultan of Kasepuhan Sultanate of Cirebon (2010–), DPD RI member (2004–2009)
- Pati Unus, 2nd sultan of Demak (1488–1521)
- Fatahillah, 16th-century commander for the Sultanate of Demak, 1st Prince of Jayakarta (Pengeran Jayakarta I)
- Ratu Bagus Angke, 2nd prince of Jayakarta (Pangeran Jayakarta II, 1570–1600)
- Wijayakrama, 3rd Prince of Jayakarta (Pangeran Jayakarta III, 1602–1619)
- Achmad Jaketra, 4th Prince of Jayakarta (Pangeran Jayakarta IV)
- Arya Jepara, Sultan of Kalinyamat (1579–1599)
- Sutawijaya, 1st sultan of Mataram (1587–1601)
- Pakubuwono II, last King of Kartasura (1726–1742), 1st Susuhunan of Surakarta Sunanate (1745–1749)
- Prince Santri, 1st Islamic King of Sumedang Larang (1530–1579)
- Prabu Geusan Ulun, 2nd Islamic King of Sumedang Larang (1579–1610)
- Rangga Gempol I, 3rd and last Islamic King of Sumedang Larang (1610–1620), Regent of Sumedang (1620–1624)

=== Kalimantan ===
- Syarif Abdurrahman Alkadrie, 1st sultan of Pontianak (1771–1808), spreader of Islam in the 18th century in West Kalimantan
- Syarif Kasim Alkadrie, 2nd sultan of Pontianak (1808–1819), Panembahan of Mempawah (1787–1808)
- Syarif Usman Alkadrie, 3rd sultan of Pontianak (1819–1855)
- Syarif Hamid Alkadrie, 4th sultan of Pontianak (1855–1872)
- Syarif Yusuf Alkadrie, 5th sultan of Pontianak (1872–1895)
- Syarif Muhammad Alkadrie, 6th sultan of Pontianak (1895–1944)
- Syarif Hamid II, 7th sultan of Pontianak (1945–1950), State Minister of Republic of the United States of Indonesia Cabinet (1949–1950)
- Syarif Abubakar Alkadrie, 8th sultan of Pontianak (2004–2017)
- Muhammad Syafiuddin I, 1st sultan of Sambas (1630–1699)
- Muhammad Syafiuddin II, 13th sultan of Sambas (1866–1922)
- Muhammad Ibrahim Syafiuddin, 15th sultan of Sambas (1931–1944)
- Sayyid Idrus, 1st Yang di-Pertuan Besar of Kubu (1772–1795)
- Syarif Salih, 8th Yang di-Pertuan Besar of Kubu (1921–1943)
- Ibrahim Chaliludin, 17th Sultan of Paser (1899–1908)

=== Maluku Islands ===
- Zainal Abidin, 18th sultan of Ternate (1486–1500)
- Bayanullah, 19th sultan of Ternate (1500–1522)
- Hidayatullah, 20th sultan of Ternate (1522–1529)
- Abu Hayat II, 21st sultan of Ternate (1529–1533)
- Tabariji, 22nd sultan of Ternate (1533–1534)
- Khairun Jamil, 23rd sultan of Ternate (1535–1570)
- Babullah, 24th sultan of Ternate (1570–1583)
- Iskandar Muhammad Jabir Shah, 47th sultan of Ternate (1929–1975)
- Mudaffar Sjah, 48th sultan of Ternate (1975–2015), DPD RI member (2004–2015), Golkar politician
- Nuku Muhammad Amiruddin, 30th sultan of Tidore (1797–1805), National Hero of Indonesia
- Zainal Abidin Syah, 37th sultan of Tidore (1947–1967), Governor of Papua (1956–1961)
- Djafar Syah, 38th sultan of Tidore (1999–2012)
- Husain Alting Sjah, 39th Sultan of Tidore (2012–), DPD RI member (2019–)

=== Sumatera ===
- Badr ul-Alam Syarif Hasyim Jamaluddin, 18th sultan of Aceh (1699–1702)
- Perkasa Alam Syarif Lamtui, 19th sultan of Aceh (1702–1703)
- Jamal ul-Alam Badr ul-Munir, 20th sultan of Aceh (1703–1726)
- Jauhar ul-Alam, 21st sultan of Aceh (1726)
- Syamsul Alam, 22nd sultan of Aceh (1726–1727)
- Syarif Saiful Alam Syah, 30th sultan of Aceh (1815–1819)
- Sayyid Ali, 8th sultan of Siak (1797–1811)
- Sayyid Ibrahim, 9th sultan of Siak (1811–1827)
- Sayyid Ismail, 10th sultan of Siak (1827–1864)
- Syarif Kasim I, 11th sultan of Siak (1864–1889)
- Syarif Hasyim, 12th sultan of Siak (1889–1908)
- Syarif Kasim II, 13th sultan of Siak (1915–1946), National Hero of Indonesia
- Syarif Abdurrahman, 1st Sultan of Pelalawan (1810–1822)
- Syarif Hasyim I, 2nd sultan of Pelalawan (1822–1828)
- Syarif Ismail, 3rd sultan of Pelalawan (1828–1844)
- Syarif Hamid, 4th sultan of Pelalawan (1844–1866)
- Syarif Jaafar, 5th sultan of Pelalawan (1866–1872)
- Syarif Abubakar, 6th sultan of Pelalawan (1872–1886)
- Syarif Harun, 9th sultan of Pelalawan (1940–1946)
- Syarif Kamaruddin, 10th sultan of Pelalawan (2008–)
- Mahmud Shah III, 15th sultan of Johor (1770–1811), National Hero of Indonesia
- Abdul Rahman Muazzam Shah, 16th Sultan of Johor (1811–1819), 1st Sultan of Lingga (1819–1832)
- Muhammad II Muazzam Shah, 2nd sultan of Lingga (1832–1842)
- Mahmud Muzaffar Shah, 3rd sultan of Lingga (1842–1857)
- Sulaiman II Badrul Alam Shah, 4th sultan of Lingga (1857–1883)
- Thaha Syaifuddin, last sultan of Jambi (1855–1858, 1900–1904), National Hero of Indonesia
- Mahmud Badaruddin I, 4th sultan of Palembang (1724–1757)
- Mahmud Badaruddin II, 7th and 8th Sultan of Palembang (1804–1812, 1818–1821), National Hero of Indonesia

== Sportspeople ==
- Ahmad Al-Khuwailid
- Ali Bagir Alhadar, basketball player
- Irfan Bachdim, footballer
- Mahdi Fahri Albaar, footballer
- Maya Sheva, karate athlete
- Muhammad Albagir, futsal player
- Muhammad Ridho, footballer
- Muhammad Rifky, footballer, actor
- Muhammad Zein Al Haddad, footballer and football coach
- Rossy Pratiwi Dipoyanti, table tennis player
- Rifat Sungkar, car racer
- Rizal Sungkar, car racer
- Rusdy Bahalwan, footballer and football coach
- Sabrina Sameh, motor racer, model, and actress
- Salim Alaydrus, footballer
- Sutan Harhara, footballer
- Thoriq Alkatiri, football referee
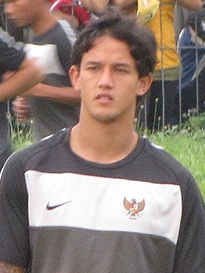
Irfan Bachdim

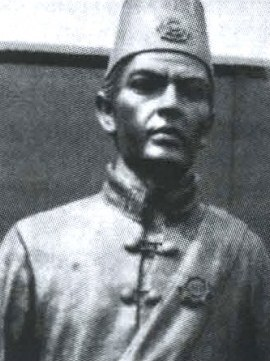
Tirtayasa

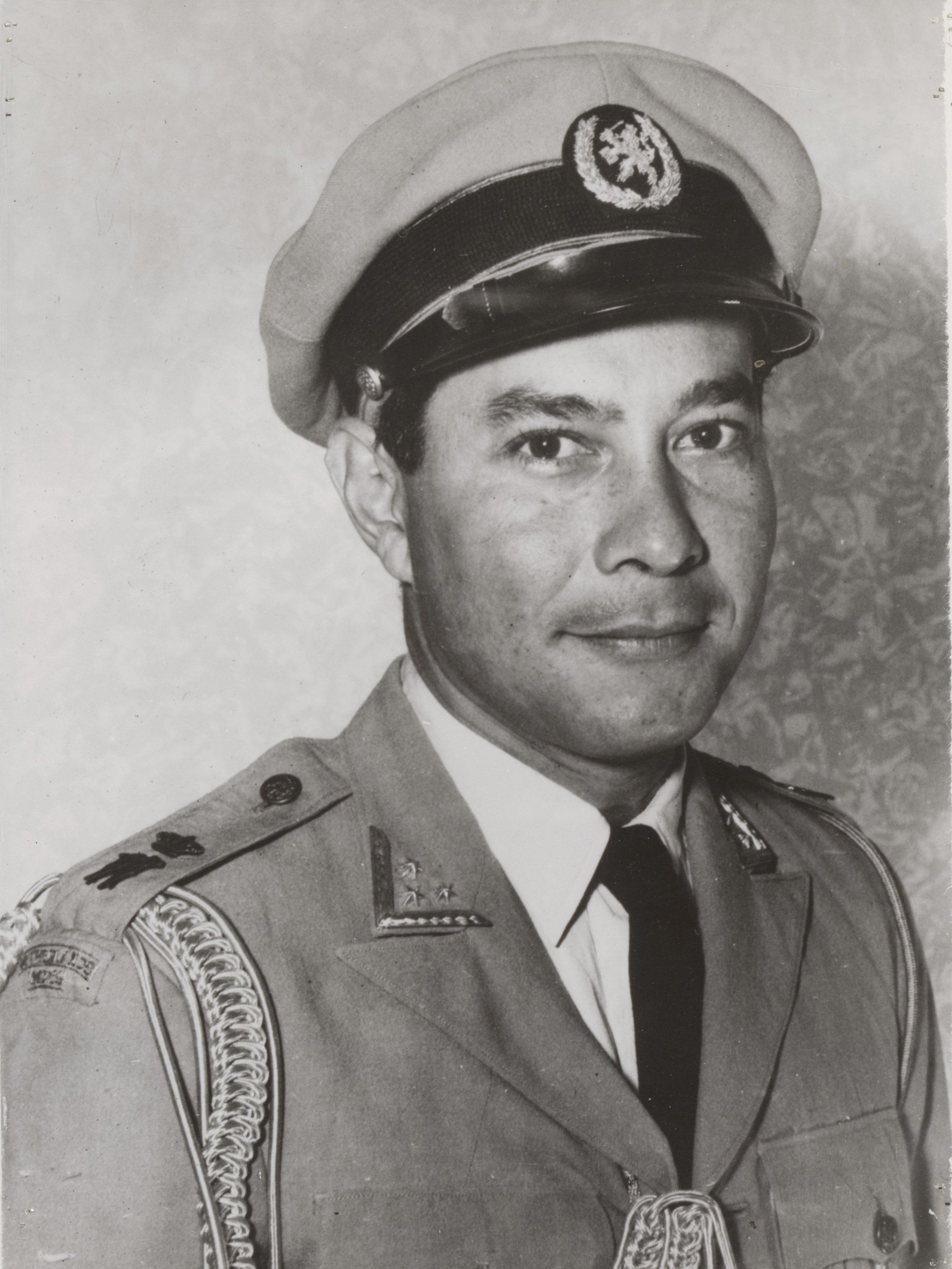
Syarif Hamid II

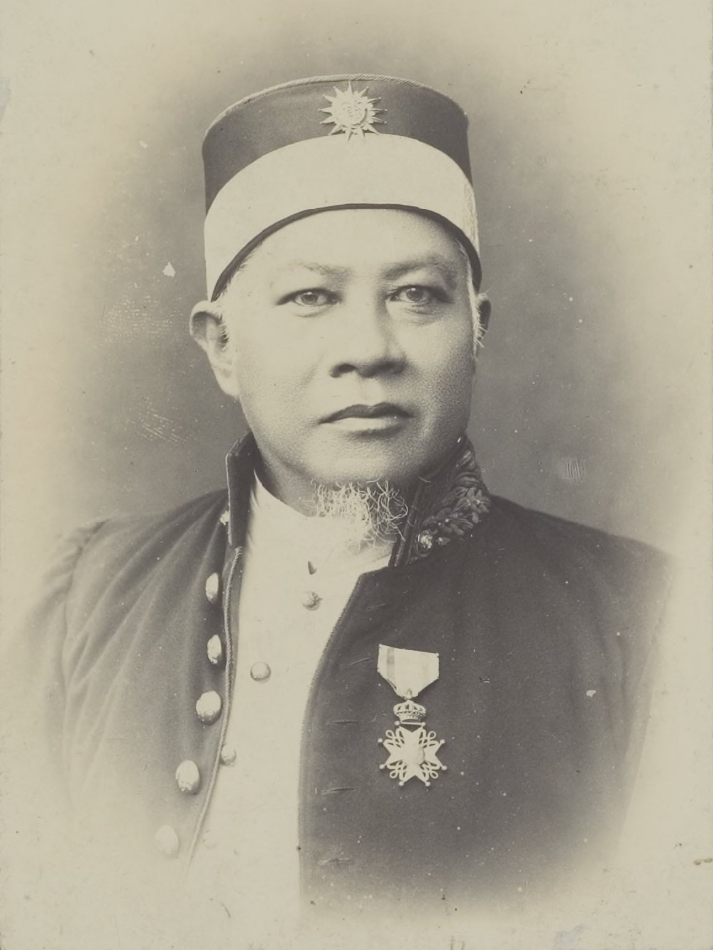
M. Syafiuddin II

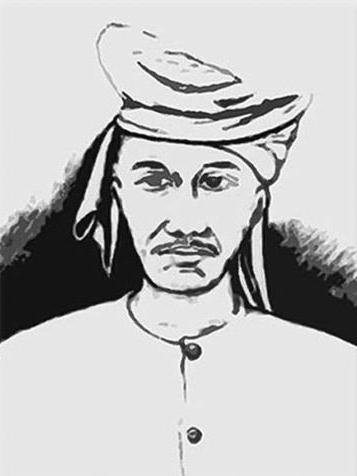
Nuku M. Amiruddin

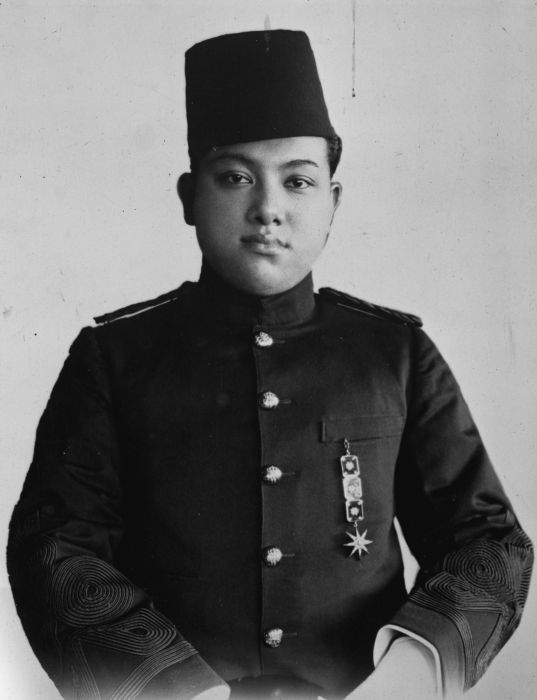
Syarif Kasim II

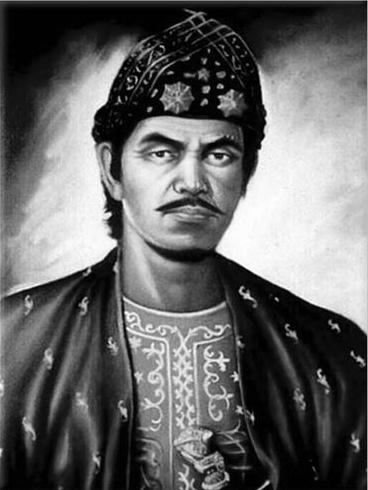
M. Badaruddin II

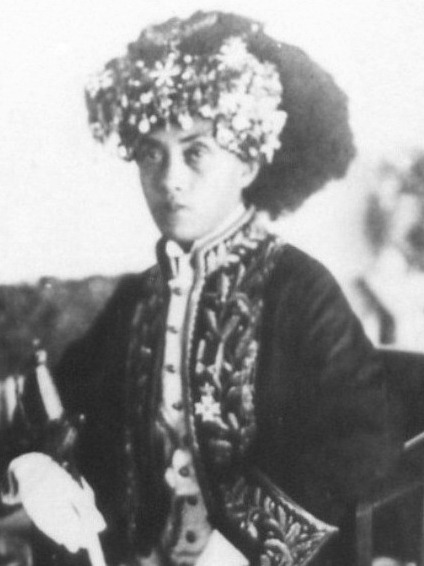
Iskandar Jabir Shah
