= List of Ba'alawi people =

Ba 'Alawi people belong to a group of Hadhrami Sayyid families and social groups originating in Hadhramaut in the Arabian Peninsula, the Yemen republic in particular. The word Sadah or Sadat is a plural form of the Arabic word Sayyid ("Descendants of Muhammad"). The word Ba 'Alawi means descendants of Alwi. The Hadhramis use the prefex "Baa" to mean the clan of.

Ba'alwi sada are descendants of the Islamic Prophet "Muhammad" through Alwi bin Ubaidillah bin Ahmad al-Muhajir. Al muhajir means the one who migrated. He migrated from Iraq due to political instability and settled in Huseisah, a village between Sey'un and Tarim in Yemen and that was in the year 318 A.H. Corresponding to 930 C.E.

== Africa ==
=== Comoros ===
- Ahmed Abdallah Mohamed Sambi, former President of Comoros

== Middle East ==
=== Yemen ===
- Abu Bakr al-Aydarus, a Sufi saint
- Ahmad bin Isa Al-Muhajir, the progenitor of Ba'alawi family
- Muhammad al-Faqih al-Muqaddam, the founder of Ba 'Alawiyya Sufi order
- Abu Bakr Salem Bilfaqih, Yemeni singer
- Umar bin Hafiz, Yemeni muslim scholar

Saudi Arabia

. Omar Al Saqqaf

== Asia ==
=== Indian subcontinent ===
- Sayyid Farooq al-Aydarus, a Lieutenant Colonel in the Bangladesh Army, lead organizer of the Bangladesh 15 August 1975 coup of Sheikh Mujibur Rahman, and 1986 Presidential Election Candidate
- Syed Ahmad El Edroos, a Major General and Commander-in-Chief of Hyderabad State Army

=== Indonesia ===
- Abdullah bin Alwi Alatas, merchant
- Abdullah ibn Shaykh al-Aydarus, a religious leader in Aceh Sultanate
- Abdul Rahman Muazzam Shah of Johor, 16th Sultan of Johor and 1st Sultan of Riau-Lingga Sultanate
- Abdurrahman Az-Zahir, a Muslim leader during Aceh War
- Abdurrahman Shihab, Indonesian academician, politician, and Qur'anic interpreter
- Ahmad Albar, Indonesian rock star and founding member of God Bless
- Ahmad Taufik Al-Jufri, Indonesian newspaper journalist
- Ali Alatas, former Foreign Minister of Indonesia
- Ali Alwi, Indonesian politician
- Ali bin Abdurrahman al-Habsyi, Indonesian preacher and cleric in Jakarta
- Ali Shahab, Indonesian film director
- Alwi Shahab, Indonesian journalist and historian
- Alwi Shihab, former foreign minister of Indonesia and Special Envoy to Middle-East
- A.N. Alcaff, Indonesian actor and film director
- Fadel Muhammad al-Haddar, former minister of maritime affairs and fisheries of Indonesia
- Haddad Alwi Assegaf, an Indonesian nasheed singer
- Haidar Bagir al-Habsyi, a scholar, founder, and CEO of Mizan Publishing Company
- Hamid Algadri, Indonesian author and politician
- Husein Aidid, Indonesian songwriter
- Husein Mutahar, Indonesian music composer
- Iqbal Assegaf, Indonesian political activist
- Mahdi Fahri Albaar, Indonesian footballer
- Moeslim Taher, Indonesian education figures, founder of Jayabaya University
- Muhamad bin Salim Alatas, member of Jakarta DPRD
- Muhammad Alhamid, former Chairman of Election Supervisory Board of Indonesia
- Muhammad bin Ali bin Yahya, Mufti of Kutai
- Muhammad Luthfi bin Yahya, the chairman of Jam'iyyah Ahli Thariqah al-Mu'tabarah al-Nahdliyah (JATMAN)
- Muhammad Rifky, Indonesian actor, and footballer
- Muhammad Rizieq Shihab, founder of Islamic Defenders Front
- Munzir Al-Musawa, founder of Majelis Rasulullah
- Najwa Shihab, Indonesian presenter
- Omar Daniel, Indonesian actor
- Quraish Shihab, former Minister of Religious Affairs of the Republic of Indonesia
- Saggaf bin Muhammad Aljufri, Indonesian Islamic scholar
- Said Assagaff, Governor of Maluku
- Shaleh Muhamad Aldjufri, Senator of the Republic of Indonesia from Central Sulawesi
- Syarif Hamid II of Pontianak, Sultan of Pontianak Sultanate
- Syarif Kasim II Banahsan of Siak, 12th Sultan of Siak Sri Indrapura Sultanate
- Syech Albar, Indonesian gambus singer
- Umay Shahab, Indonesian actor
- Usman bin Yahya, Mufti of Batavia

=== Malaysia ===
- Alwi bin Thohir al-Haddad, Mufti of Johor
- Syarif Masahor, a Malaysian Warrior
- Mahmud Shah III of Johor, 15th Sultan and Yang di-Pertuan Besar of Johor and Pahang and their dependencies, National Hero of Indonesia
- Sayyid Abdullah Al-Aidarus, religious leader
- Syed Shekh Hassan Barakbah, a prominent judge in Malaysia
- Syed Hamid al-Bar, politician and former Malaysian Minister of Home Affairs
- Putra of Perlis, a Sultan of Perlis State in Malaysia
- Syed Muhammad Naquib al-Attas, a Muslim scholar
- Syed Hussein Alatas, Malaysian academic, sociologist, founder of social science organizations, and politician and the older brother of Syed Muhammad Naquib al-Attas
- Syed Farid al-Attas, Malaysian sociologist and the son of Syed Hussein Alatas
