= Abdullah al-Aydarus =

ʿAbdullāh Al-ʿAydarūs (العيدروس also spelled in romanized as Al-Aidrus, Al-Aidroos, Al-Aydarus, Al-Edrus or Al-Idrus) is the name of several people of Hadhrami heritage:

- ʿAbdullāh ibn ʿAbd al-Rahman as-Saqqāf Al-Aydarus, scholar and father of Abu Bakr al-Aydarus, the founder of the al-ʿAydarūs branch of the Bā ʿAlawiyyah clan
- ʿAbdullāh al-ʿAydarūs (died 1582), a Gujarati Sufi scholar
- Abdullah ibn Shaykh al-Aydarus (died 1609), Acehnese religious leader (naqib)
