= Embassy of Indonesia, Abu Dhabi =

Indonesian Embassy in Abu Dhabi, UAE

Embassy of the Republic of Indonesia in Abu Dhabi

- Location: Abu Dhabi, United Arab Emirates
- Address: 42, Al Yaqout Street; Embassy Area; Abu Dhabi; United Arab Emirates
- Coordinates: 24.42715754635982°N 54.43079179169132°E
- Ambassador: Husin Bagis
- Website: kemlu.go.id/abudhabi/en

The Embassy of the Republic of Indonesia in Abu Dhabi is the diplomatic mission of the Republic of Indonesia to the United Arab Emirates (UAE). Indonesia also has a consulate general in Dubai that opened in February 2003. The first Indonesian ambassador to the UAE was Abdullah Fuad Rachman (1993–1996). The current ambassador, Husin Bagis, was appointed by President Joko Widodo on 25 February 2016.

== History ==
Diplomatic relations between Indonesia and UAE were established in 1976. The Indonesian embassy in Abu Dhabi opened on 28 October 1978. The head of the mission was Chargés d'affaires Abdullatief Taman. The embassy was not headed by an ambassador until 1993, when on 29 March of that year, the Indonesian government sent Abdullah Fuad Rachman as the first Indonesian ambassador to UAE. Rachman presented his letter of credentials to the President UAE, Zayed bin Sultan Al Nahyan, on 6 April 1993.

== See also ==
- Indonesia–United Arab Emirates relations
- List of diplomatic missions of Indonesia
- List of diplomatic missions of United Arab Emirates
