= Kertoboso Bustam =

Vereenigte Oostindische Compagnie secretary

Kyai Ngabei Kertoboso Bustam or Kyai Bustaman (1681?–1769) was a VOC secretary in Semarang, Dutch East Indies. He originally came from Hadramaut, Yemen. Kyai Ngabehi Kertoboso Bustam is the ancestor of the Bustaman clan who later produced regents and priyayis in the northern coast of Java, including the famous Romantic painter Raden Saleh. Kampung Bustaman in Semarang City was named after him, although only a few of his descendants remain in Semarang.
