= Fachrul Baraqbah =

Indonesian politician (1925–1980)

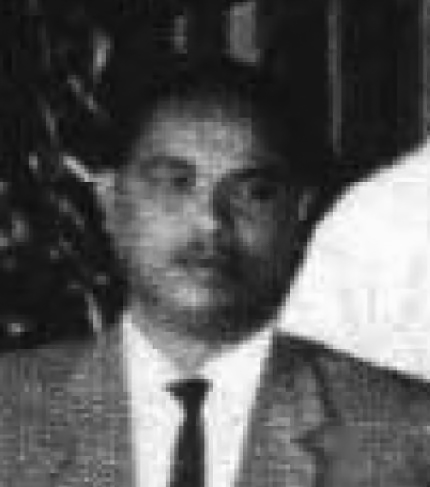
- Born: 1925; Tenggarong, Kutai Sultanate, Dutch East Indies
- Died: 1980 (aged 54–55); Samarinda, East Kalimantan, Indonesia

Fachrul Baraqbah (1925–1980) was an Indonesian politician who was a member of the Kutai Sultanate royal family and was a mid-level leader of the Communist Party of Indonesia (PKI) until his arrest in 1965 during the anti-communist repression preceding the Transition to the New Order. As an aristocrat, he was considered an anomaly for supporting the Indonesian National Revolution, renouncing his royal title, and joining the PKI.

== Life ==
Fachrul Baraqbah was born in town of Tenggarong, East Kalimantan, Dutch East Indies in 1925. He was of mixed Kutai and Arab-Indonesian descent, and was considered a Sayyid or descendant of Muhammad. He was the youngest of three siblings, the other two being Mochsen Baraqbah and Gasyim Baraqbah. His education was in a Hollandsch Inlandsche School, a Dutch language primary school for native Indonesians, as opposed to most of his family members, who studied at OSVIA (Opleiding School Voor Inlandsche Ambtenaren), a school for civil servants.

At some point, after becoming interested in politics he became regional committee head of the Indonesian Communist Party in East Kalimantan. At that point he disowned his own aristocratic status and no longer used it in public to refer to himself. During the Indonesian National Revolution, he joined guerrilla groups of Indonesian nationalists in Samarinda and helped incite uprisings in East Kalimantan. He joined the Kalimantan branch of the BPRI (Indonesian People's Revolutionary Front), a local iteration of a national paramilitary organization founded in 1945 in Surabaya, Java by Sutomo. During that time, the Kutai Sultanate royal family was supportive of a return of Dutch rule despite popular grassroots support for independence. Therefore, Fachrul became a prominent opponent of aristocratic rule in Kalimantan. He fled to East Java in 1947 when nationalist uprisings in Kalimantan were mostly suppressed and joined the guerrilla war against the Dutch there.

In Yogyakarta, he helped found Pesindo (Indonesian Socialist Youth) and became active in FDR (Indonesian: Front Demokrat Rakyat, People's Democratic Front). He was involved in the Madiun Affair, but was able to escape arrest in the aftermath of the incident. In 1950, he returned to East Kalimantan and once again became chief of the regional committee of the Indonesian Communist Party.

He became a close friend of the commander of the Kodam VI/Mulawarman at the time, Brigadier R. Soeharjo. Other than that, he became a key figure in supporting labor union mobilizations, especially in the oil industry in Balikpapan. He pushed for nationalization of oil production in Kalimantan, notably those operations owned by Shell, as well as the Dutch shipping company Koninklijke Paketvaart-Maatschappij. He was an opponent of the continued existence of autonomous royal regions in Indonesia, and said in his speech during the 6th Indonesian Communist Party National Congress in 1959 that Indonesia should abolish them, including Kutai Sultanate. He argued that royal regions (swapraja) were remnants of Dutch collaboration and the feudal past, and went so far as to advocate purges of aristocratic families. He then became a member of the People's Consultative Assembly, as well as deputy speaker of the East Kalimantan provincial parliament.

He was arrested for his involvement in communist-related activities following the 30 September Movement, the coup d'état against Sukarno by Suharto, and the subsequent purge of communists in Indonesia in 1965. He was sentenced to death by a court in Balikpapan on 29 November 1966, for his supposed role in the 30 September coup attempt. However, his sentence was reduced to a life sentence and he was placed under house arrest by Indonesian military in Jakarta until 1974. During his house arrest, he interacted with Indonesian students who later became involved in demonstrations against Japanese investment in Indonesia, later known as the Malari incident. He didn't serve his entire sentence and was released in 1980; he returned to Samarinda, where he died shortly thereafter.

== Legacy ==
According to Burhan Magenda from Cornell University, Fachrul was an anomaly among Arab-Indonesians, especially with his title as Sayyid. In Antropologi Indonesia magazine, he wrote that it was rare for Arab-Indonesians to became communists, as they often belonged to Islamist parties. Despite being a communist, according to East Kalimantan media Prokal, he was still a devout Muslim and never abandoned his Sayyid title.

He was regarded by people of East Kalimantan as an "unfortunately misguided figure", choosing communism to oppose return of colonialism and to liberate the Indonesian people of East Kalimantan.
