= Yasmine Zaki Shahab =

Indonesian anthropologist

Professor Yasmine Zaki Shahab S.S., M.A., Ph.D.
- ياسمين زكي شهاب
- Born: Yasmine Zaki Shahab; December 1, 1948 (age 77); Mangga Besar, West Jakarta, Jakarta
- Education: University of Indonesia (1975); Australian National University (1982); SOAS, University of London (1994)
- Occupation: Anthropologist
- Spouse: Saleh Umar
- Children: Mariam Katlea; Husein Haikel
- Parents: Zaki Shahab (father); Lulu Al Hadad (mother)
- Relatives: Fuad Hassan (cousin)
- Awards: Anugerah Budaya 2013

Professor Yasmine Zaki Shahab, S.S., M.A., Ph.D. (Arabic: ياسمين زكي شهاب, romanized: Yāsmīn Zakī Šahāb; Arabic pronunciation: [ja:smi:n zakiː ʃahaːb]; born 1 December 1948) is an Indonesian anthropologist. In addition, her interest in Betawi society made her actively doing research and writing the topic about that. To date, Shahab is still active in some matters relating to Betawi culture.

== Biography ==
=== Early life ===
Shahab was born in Mangga Besar, West Jakarta as the fifth child of eight children. Shahab comes from the Ba 'Alawi sada family of Hadhrami surnamed Aal Shihāb-Uddīn, her father named Zaki bin Ali bin Ahmad Shahab, while his mother also comes from the family of Ba Alawi named Lulu Al Hadad. His grandfather, Ali bin Ahmad bin Shahab or more popular with the call of Ali Menteng was the landlord of Menteng, Central Jakarta.

=== Education ===
Shahab's parents sent their eight children to school in Catholic schools, which at that time was considered more advanced than other public schools. Shahab then went to Santa Melania Elementary School, Sawah Besar, Central Jakarta; Santa Maria Junior High School, Central Jakarta; and Santa Ursula High School, Lapangan Banteng, Central Jakarta. After graduating high school, she intends to continue her studies at the Faculty of Law, University of Indonesia. But that desire she undo after her cousin, Fuad Hassan suggested that Shahab take a major in anthropology. The reason was because at that time students in anthropology majors are still few, only five to seven people only, so the chance to stand out will be greater.

Shahab graduated with a bachelor's degree from the Faculty of Arts, University of Indonesia in 1975 with a thesis entitled Masalah Integrasi Minoritas Arab di Jakarta (The Problem of Integration of Arab Minorities in Jakarta). Then, the Master of Arts degree she took at the Australian National University in 1982 with a thesis entitled The Position of Betawi Women. While, her Ph.D degree she got at SOAS, University of London in 1994 with a dissertation entitled Creation of Ethnic Tradition Betawi of Jakarta.

=== Personal life ===
Yasmine Zaki Shahab was married to Saleh Umar and has two children, Mariam Katlea (born 1978) and Husein Haikel (born 1983).

== Career ==
Yasmine Zaki Shahab is an anthropology lecturer at the University of Indonesia. From 1998 to 2001, Shahab taught the course of Introduction to Anthropology. In the same period she also taught subjects of Population Anthropology, Tourism Anthropology, then Theory of Anthropology I and II. In addition to teaching at the Undergraduate Program of Anthropology Department, she also taught at the University of Indonesia extension program, which she teach was Introduction to Anthropology.

In the postgraduate program, she also taught the Population Anthropology course from 1998 to 2000. In addition, she also taught at the University of Indonesia Tourism Diploma Program.

== Works ==
=== Thesis and dissertation ===
- Masalah Integrasi Minoritas Arab di Jakarta (1975)
- The Position of Betawi Women: Native People in Jakarta (1982)
- The Creation of Ethnic Tradition: the Betawi of Jakarta (1994)

=== Journal ===
- Alih Fungsi Seni dalam Masyarakat Kompleks: Kasus Liang-Liong dan Barongsai (2000)
- Rekacipta Tradisi Betawi: Sisi Otoritas dalam Proses Nasionalisasi Tradisi Lokal (2001)
- Seni sebagai Ekspresi Eksistensi Tantangan Kebijakan Multikulturalisme (2004)
- Sistim Kekerabatan sebagai Katalisator Peran Ulama Keturunan Arab di Jakarta (2005)

=== Book ===
- Betawi dalam Perspektif Kontemporer: Perkembangan, Potensi, dan Tantangannya (1997), published by Lembaga Kebudayaan Betawi
- Busana Betawi: Sejarah & Prospek Pengembangannya (2000), published by Provincial Government of the Special Capital Region of Jakarta
- Pemahaman Pluralisme Budaya Melalui Seni Pertunjukan (2002), published by Indonesian Institute of Sciences
- Identitas dan Otoritas: Rekonstruksi Tradisi Betawi (2004), published by Faculty of Social and Political Sciences, University of Indonesia

== Awards ==
As a form of appreciation from the Provincial Government of Jakarta to Yasmine Zaki Shahab for his attention to Betawi culture, in 2013 she was selected as the recipient of the awards of humanist category at the 2013 Cultural Award.
