= Ahmad Al-Khuwailid =

Indonesian footballer (born 2000)

Personal information
- Full name: Ahmad Al-Khuwailid Mustafa
- Date of birth: 29 January 2000 (age 26)
- Place of birth: Lhokseumawe, Indonesia
- Height: 1.74 m (5 ft 9 in)
- Position: Midfielder

Youth career
- 2011–2019: Al-Duhail

Senior career*
Years	Team	Apps	(Gls)
2019–2020	Al-Duhail	0	(0)
2020–2024	Qatar SC	18	(0)
2023–2024	→ Lusail (loan)	2	(0)
- * Club domestic league appearances and goals as of 23 December 2023

Ahmad Al-Khuwailid Mustafa (Arabic:أحمد الخويلد مصطفى; born 29 January 2000) is an Indonesian professional footballer who plays as a midfielder.

== Football career ==
Khuwailid has been in Al-Duhail since he was 10 years old. In 2020 he played for the Al Duhail U-23 team and won the Qatar U-23 League title, he was promoted to the first team since the start of the season.

He was successful with his team at the junior level, namely U-19. Khuwailid appeared regularly in these two age groups. In addition to the two age levels, he won the U-19 Cup.

He made his professional debut in the Qatar Stars League on 9 April 2021, against Al Sadd where he played as a substitute.

== Personal life ==
Khuwailid Mustafa was born on January 29, 2000, in Lhokseumawe, Aceh to Mustafa Ibrahim and Yulizar Syamsuddin. Together with his family, he moved to Qatar when he was 5 months old.

== Career statistics ==
=== Club ===
As of 23 December 2023

Club	Season	League			Cup (Note: Includes Qatar FA Cup)		Continental		Other (Note: Appearances in Qatari Stars Cup)		Total	
Club	Season	Division	Apps	Goals	Apps	Goals	Apps	Goals	Apps	Goals	Apps	Goals
Al-Duhail	2017–18	Qatar Stars League	–		0	0	–		1	0	1	0
Al-Duhail	2018–19	Qatar Stars League	–		0	0	–		1	0	1	0
Al-Duhail	2019–20	Qatar Stars League	0	0	0	0	0	0	4	0	4	0
Al-Duhail	2020–21	Qatar Stars League	0	0	0	0	0	0	2	0	2	0
Al-Duhail	Total		0	0	0	0	0	0	8	0	8	0
Qatar	2020–21	Qatar Stars League	1	0	3	1	0	0	0	0	4	1
Qatar	2021–22	Qatar Stars League	8	0	0	0	0	0	7	1	15	1
Qatar	2022–23	Qatar Stars League	9	0	0	0	0	0	0	0	9	0
Qatar	2024–25	Qatar Stars League	0	0	0	0	0	0	0	0	0	0
Qatar	Total		18	0	3	1	0	0	7	1	28	2
Lusail	2023–24	Qatari Second Division	2	0	0	0	0	0	0	0	2	0
Career total			20	0	3	1	0	0	15	1	38	2
