= Muhammad Rifky =

Indonesian actor and football player

Rifky Alhabsy
- Born: Muhammad Rifky Alhabsy; May 9, 1984 (age 42); Surabaya, East Java, Indonesia
- Occupations: actor, model, film producer
- Years active: 2003–present
- Height: 178 cm (5 ft 10 in)
- Spouse: Yulia Rahmayani

Muhammad Rifky
Personal information
- Full name: Muhammad Rifky Alhabsyi
- Date of birth: 9 May 1984 (age 42)
- Place of birth: Surabaya, Indonesia
- Height: 1.78 m (5 ft 10 in)
- Position: Striker

Youth career
- 2000–2002: Persija Suratin
- 2003–2004: PON DKI

Senior career*
Years	Team	Apps	(Gls)
2008–2009	Persiba Balikpapan	7	(0)
2009–2010	Persikabo Bogor	11	(0)
2010–2011	Sriwijaya	4	(0)
2011–2013	PSIM Yogyakarta	15	(1)
- * Club domestic league appearances and goals as of 11 July 2012

Muhammad Rifky Alhabsyi (born May 9, 1984) is an Indonesian actor, model, film producer, and former professional footballer.

He retired from football in 2015.

== Personal life ==
He was an actor before he returned to play football in 2008.

== Filmography ==
=== Film ===
Year	Title	Role	Description
2003	Bola Itu Bundar		
2004	17th	Rio	Kharisma Starvision Plus
TBA	Jangan Berhenti Menyayangi Aku: Janji Untuk Negeri	Haidar	Sinta Perkasa Film

Description

Not yet
- TBA : To be announced
- N/A: Not Available

=== Television series ===
Year	Title	Role	Description
2004	Cinta Memang Gila	Marco	Works debut
2004	Titipan Ilahi	Robby	
2004—2005	Si Bajaj	Romi	
2004—2006	Bawang Merah Bawang Putih	Andre	
2005	Primadona	Yongki	
2005	Hidayah	Rully	Episode: "Memakan Uang"
2006	Keajaiban Cinta		
2007	Si Yoyo 3		musim 3
2007	Mimpi Manis 2		musim 2
2007	Ghost	Alan	Episode: "Jenglot"
2015	Pamali	Rinto	Episode: "Melukis Anak Menangis"
2017	Nadin	Akbar	
2017	Oh Mama Oh Papa	Rully	Guest star
2018	Wanita Perindu Surga	Anto	Guest star (Eps. 64)
2018	Malaikat Tak Bersayap	Rey	Guest star
2018	Kun Fayakun	Rocky	Guest star (Eps. 38)
2018	Karma the series	Yudi	Guest star
2018	Karma the series	Ardi	Guest star (Eps. 108)
2018	Wanita Perindu Surga 2	Rahmat	Guest star (Eps. 8)
2018	Azab		Episode: "Kisah Anak Bakhil Kepada Orang Tua Yang Jenazahnya Dimakan Buaya"
2018	Azab		Episode: "Kuburan Tukang Tipu Penuh Batu Dan Jenazahnya Membusuk Sebelum Dikuburkan"
2018	Azab		Episode: "Akibat Zalim Kepada Ayah, Keranda Jenazah Anak Diserang Lebah"
2018	Azab		Episode: "Puluhan Kilat Dan Petir Menyambar Tubuh Si Pencuri Listrik Yang Culas"
2018	Azab		Episode: "Preman Tukang Palak, Jenazahnya Membusuk Berhari-Hari Di Hutan"
2018	Azab		Episode: "Jenazah Supir Angkot Serakah Menghitam Terkena Oli Dan Liang Lahatnya Dipenuhi Cairan Hitam"
2018	Azab		Episode: "Keserakahan Suami Yang Mengorbankan Anaknya, Liang Lahatnya Mengeluarkan Cairan Hitam"
2018	Azab		Episode: "Mengaku Ahli Waris, Makamnya Hancur Di Pusaran Tanah"
2018	Azab		Episode: "Nasib Si Pewaris Serakah Yang Tak Pernah Taubat"
2019	Firasat	Desta	Guest star (Eps. 59)
2019	Firasat	Budi	Guest star (Eps. 99)
2019	Jodoh Wasiat Bapak	Iwang	Guest star (Eps. 1021)
2021	Jodoh Wasiat Bapak Babak 2	Fatur	Guest star (Eps. 136)<
2021	Jodoh Wasiat Bapak Babak 2	Aldo	Guest star (Eps. 167)
2021	Jodoh Wasiat Bapak Babak 2	Sodik	Guest star (Eps. 194)
2021	Jodoh Wasiat Bapak Babak 2	Udin	Guest star (Eps. 222)
2021	Jodoh Wasiat Bapak Babak 2	Jafar	Guest star (Eps. 251)
2021	Jodoh Wasiat Bapak Babak 2	Komar	Guest star (Eps. 273)
2022	Panggilan	Ferry	Guest star (Eps. 84 — 87)
2022	Panggilan	Hadi	Guest star (Eps. 84 — 87)
