= Abdullah bin Alwi Alatas =

Sayyid Abdullah bin Alwi Alatas
- عبدالله بن علوي العطاس
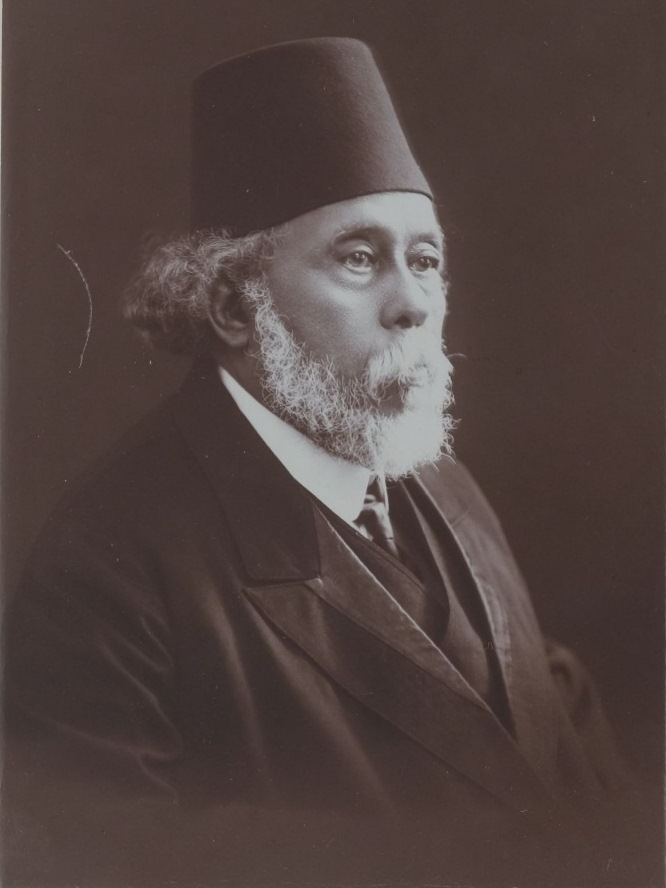
- Alatas in 1922 in Weltevreden, Batavia
- Born: Sayyid Abdullah; 1840; Pekojan, Tambora, Jakarta
- Died: 1929 (aged 88–89); Tanah Abang, Jakarta
- Other names: Sayyid Abdullah
- Occupations: Merchant; philanthropist; landlord
- Movement: Pan-Islamism
- Spouse: Syarifah Maryam
- Children: Ismail Alatas

Sayyid Abdullah bin Alwi Alatas (Arabic: عبدالله بن علوي العطاس, romanized: ʻAbdullāh bin ʻAlwī al-Aṭṭās; 1840–1929) was a Dutch East Indies merchant, landlord, and philanthropist of Arab descent from the Ba 'Alawi sada clan. Alatas is also the owner of the Cikini House (now Cikini Hospital) after it was bought from Raden Saleh. He also inherited another eccentric house, such as a house built by a Frenchman in an Islamic style (now a Textile Museum).

Alwi Shahab, a senior Indonesian journalist, also wrote in his book Saudagar Baghdad dari Betawi (2004) that Alatas was the grandfather of Ali Alatas, the former Indonesian Foreign Minister (1998–1999), and Haidar Abu Bakr al-Attas, former Prime Minister of Yemen (1990–1994) and South Yemen (1985–1986).
