= Muhamad bin Salim Alatas =

Indonesian politician

Habib Muhamad bin Salim Alatas
- محمد بن سالم العطاس
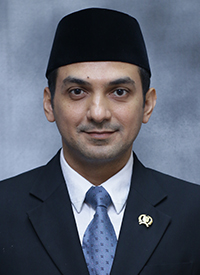
- Portrait of Alatas in 2019 as member of Jakarta DPRD

Member of Jakarta Regional People's Representative Council
- Incumbent
- Assumed office August 26, 2009
- Preceded by: None
- Parliamentary group: National Mandate Party
- Constituency: DKI Jakarta 8 (Jagakarsa, Mampang Prapatan, Pancoran, Pasar Minggu, and Tebet)
- Majority: 15,176 (2019)

Personal details
- Born: Muhamad bin Salim Alatas; March 10, 1979 (age 47) Jakarta, Indonesia
- Party: National Mandate Party
- Parent: Habib Salim bin Umar Alatas (father)
- Muhamad bin Salim Alatas on Instagram

Habib Muhamad bin Salim Alatas (Arabic: محمد بن سالم العطاس, romanized: Muḥammad bin Sālim al-ʻAṭṭās, Arabic pronunciation: [muħammad bin saːlim al-ʕatˤtˤaːs]; born March 10, 1979) or also known as Habib Muhamad is an Indonesian politician who currently serves as a member of the Jakarta parliament (Jakarta Regional People's Representative Council) from the National Mandate Party.
