= Syech Albar =

Syech Albar شيخ البار
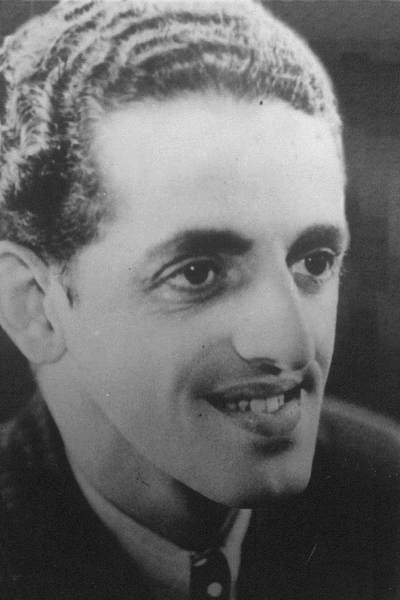
- Syech Albar c. 1939

Background information
- Also known as: Sech Albar
- Born: Syech; 1908; Soerabaja, Dutch East Indies
- Died: October 30, 1947 (aged 38–39) Surabaya, Indonesia
- Genre: Gambus
- Occupation: Singer
- Years active: 1935–1947
- Labels: His Master's Voice; Canary Records
- Formerly of: S. Albar Orchestra

Syech bin Abdullah Albar (Arabic: شيخ بن عبد الله البار, romanized: Šayḵ bin ʿAbd Allāh Al-Bār, Arabic pronunciation: [ʃajx bin ʕabdullah albaːr]; 1908 – October 30, 1947) or better known as Syech Albar (also written Sech Albar) was an Indonesian gambus singer of Hadhrami Arab descendants from Surabaya. Albar was pioneer of gambus music in Indonesia, he has a gambus orchestra named Al Wathon (S. Albar Orchestra) which first aired in 1935 at NIROM Surabaya. In Surabaya, Albar produced many gramophone plate recordings. His gramophone plate recording in 1937 was titled "Zahrotoel Hoesoen", with a description of "modern Arabic songs" and recorded on His Master's Voice label. Albar signed a contract with His Master's Voice for the first time in 1931. In addition to His Master's Voice, the songs of S. Albar Orchestra were also recorded on the Canary Records label.
