= Husein Aidid =

Husein Aidid حسين عيديد
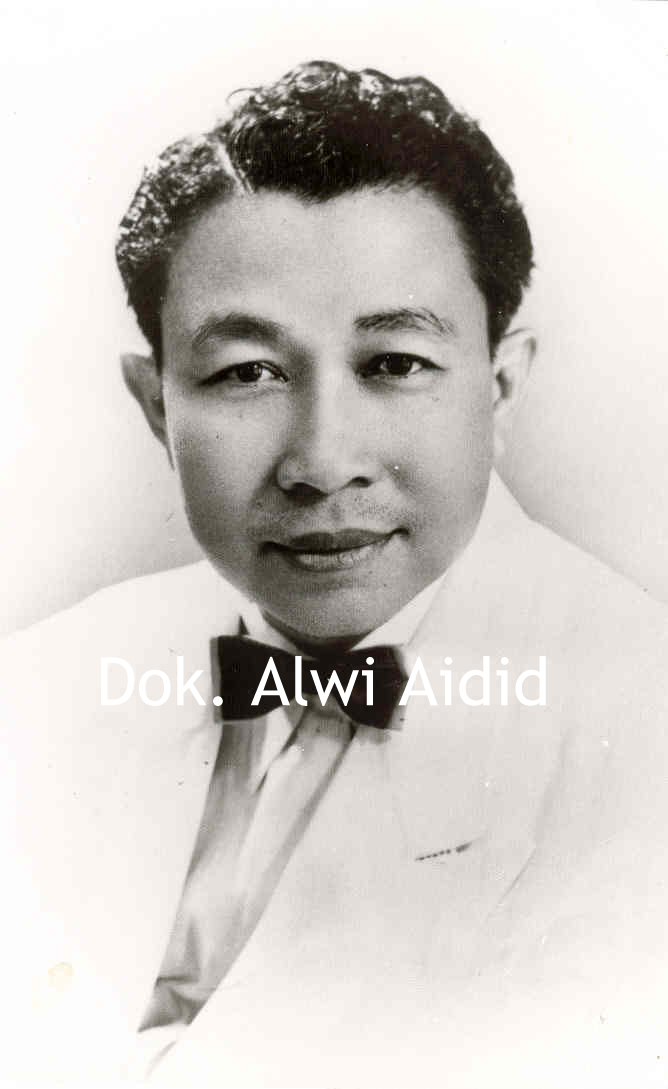
- Husein Aidid

Background information
- Born: Husein; 1913; Pekojan, Tambora, Jakarta
- Origin: Jakarta, Indonesia
- Died: September 13, 1965 (aged 51–52) Tanah Abang, Central Jakarta
- Genres: Gambus
- Occupations: Songwriter; singer; Businessperson
- Instruments: Qanbūs; violin; piano
- Years active: 1947–1962
- Label: Bali record
- Past members: Orkes Gambus al-Usysyaaq (1947–1950); Orkes Melayu Kenangan (1950–1962)

Husein Aidid (Arabic: حسين عيديد, romanized: Ḥusayn ʻAydīd, Arabic pronunciation: [ħuˈsajn ?ajdi:d]; born 1913) was an Indonesian songwriter, singer and entrepreneur. Aidid was the founder and leader of the Orkes Gambus al-Usysyaaq (founded in 1947) which became the Orkes Melayu Kenangan in 1950. Together with his new Malay Orchestra, on October 26, 1950, Aidid began its first broadcast on Radio Republik Indonesia and was broadcast nationally. At that time, RRI was the most popular entertainment facilities of society.

Aidid died in September 13, 1965.

== Biography ==
=== Early life ===
Aidid was born in an Arab village in Pekojan, West Jakarta in 1913.

He played piano and violin.

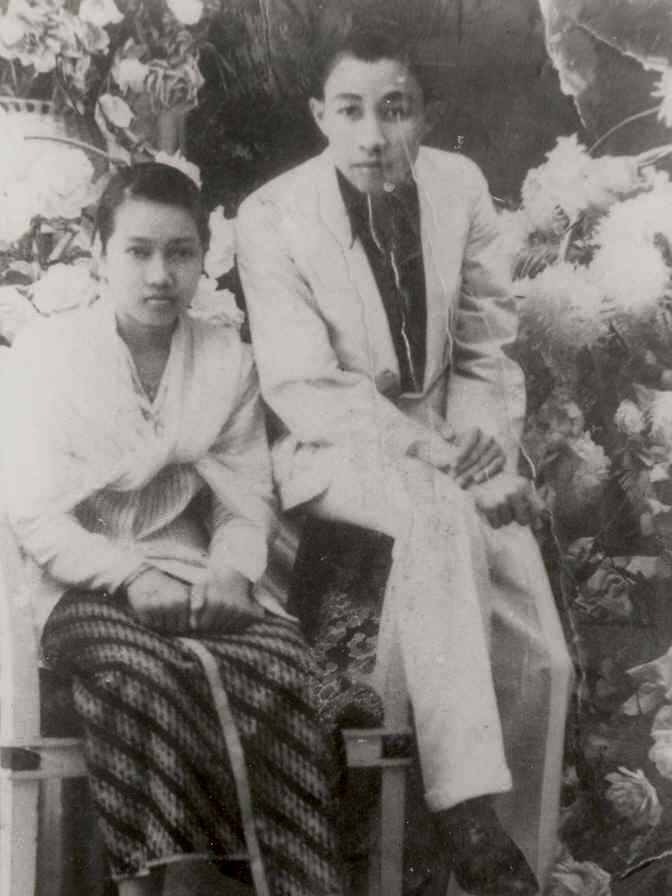
Aidid (right) and his wife, Saodah.

=== Personal life ===
Aidid married a Betawi girl named Saodah and had six children, three boys and three girls.
