= Abdullah ibn Shaykh al-Aydarus =

Sayyid ʿAbdullāh bin Shaykh al-ʿAydarūs (Arabic: عبد الله بن شيج العيدروس, died 1609) was a Hadhrami religious leader who lived in the 16th century. He was descended from the scholar-saint of Tarim, Imam Abdullah al- 'Aydarus al-Akbar.

Abdullah was among the earliest Hadhrami Arab settlers in Aceh, and, like many of his kinsmen who came after, he served as the Naqib "religious leader" of Aceh. Sultan Alauddin Mansur Syah of the Aceh Sultanate (reigned 1577–1585) persuaded ʿAbdullah to marry his daughter, and his son Zayn al-ʿAbidin was born out of this union. In his later years, he led his life in a local village, Kampung Pasir Putih, where he died of old age.

ʿAbdullāh's son Zayn al-ʿAbidin also became a religious leader and migrated to Johor, where he married Tun Kaishi, the daughter of Tun Jenal, the Bendahara of Sekudai and took up the Malay name of "Tun Dagang" while staying with the Bendahara's family.

== Genealogy ==
His lineage stated as the following;

'Abdullah ibn Shaykh ibn Abdullah ibn Shaykh ibn Abdullah al- 'Aydarus ibn Abi Bakr al-Sakran ibn Abd al-Rahman al-Saqqaf ibn Muhammad Mawla al-Dawilah ibn 'Ali ibn 'Alawi al-Ghayyur ibn Muhammad al-Faqih al-Muqaddam ibn Ali ibn Muhammad Sahib Mirbat ibn 'Ali Khali' Qasam ibn 'Alawi ibn Muhammad ibn 'Alawi ibn 'Ubaydullah ibn Ahmad al-Muhajir ibn Isa ibn Muhammad al-Naqib ibn 'Ali al- 'Uraydi ibn Ja'far al-Sadiq ibn Muhammad al-Baqir ibn 'Ali Zayn al- 'Abidin ibn Husayn al-Sibt ibn Imam 'Ali ibn Abi Talib.

== See also ==
- Ali al-Uraidhi ibn Ja'far al-Sadiq
