= Arab Indonesians =

Ethnic group

Orang Arab Indonesia عرب إندونيسيا
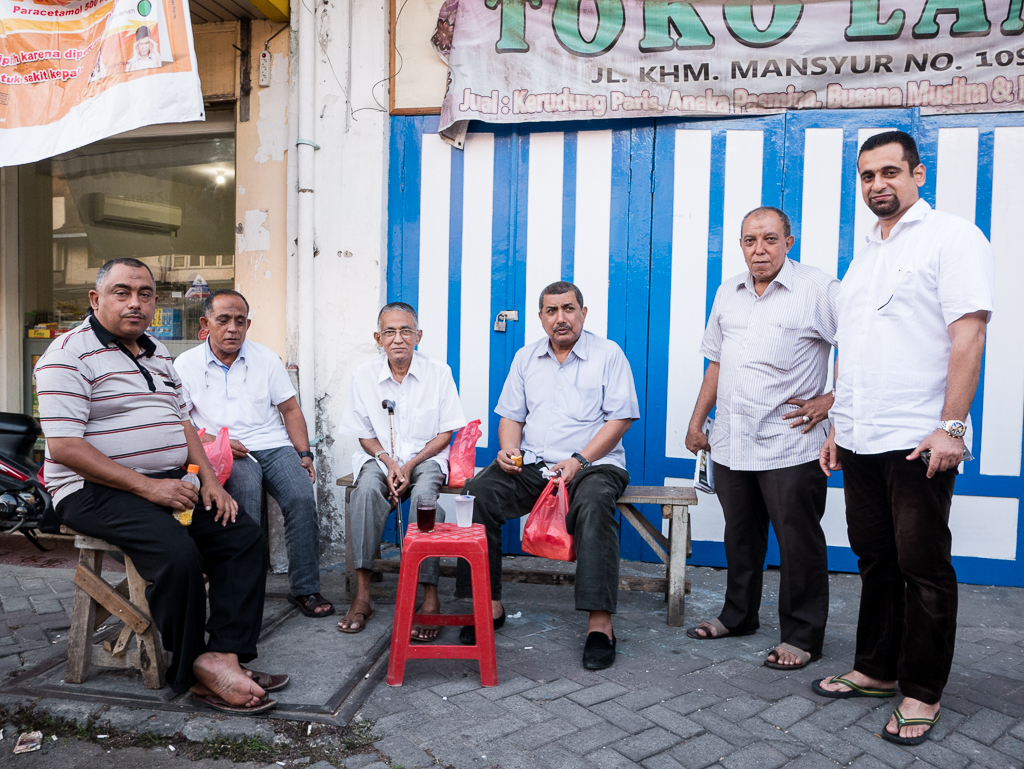
- Arab Indonesians from Surabaya's Arabic Quarter, Ampel

Total population
- 118,866 (2010)

Regions with significant populations
- South Sumatra, Jakarta, West Java, Central Java, East Java, South Kalimantan, Maluku

Languages
- Indonesian, Arabic (especially Indonesian Arabic), Various Indonesian regional languages

Religion
- Predominantly Sunni Islam, minority others

Related ethnic groups
- Arab Muslims, Hadharem, Arab Malaysians, Arab Singaporeans, Arab diaspora

Arab Indonesians (Indonesian: Orang Arab Indonesia; Arabic: عربٌ إندونيسيون), or colloquially known as Jama'ah, are Indonesians of mixed Arab, mainly Hadharem from Yemen, and Indonesian descent. The ethnic group generally also includes those of Arab descent from other Middle Eastern Arabic speaking nations. Restricted under Dutch East Indies law until 1919, the community elites later gained economic power through real estate investment and trading. Currently found mainly in Java, especially West Java and East Java, they are almost all Muslims.

The official number of Arab and part-Arab descent in Indonesia was recorded since 19th century. The census of 1870 recorded a total of 12,412 Arab Indonesians (7,495 living in Java and Madura and the rest in other islands). By 1900, the total number of Arabs citizens increased to 27,399, then 44,902 by 1920, and 71,335 by 1930.

== History ==
Indonesia has had contact with the Arab world prior to the emergence of Islam in Indonesia as well as since pre-Islamic times. The earliest Arabs to arrive in Indonesia were traders who came from Southern Arabia and other Arab states of the Persian Gulf. Arab traders helped bring the spices of Indonesia, such as nutmeg, to Europe as early as the 8th century. However, Arab settlements mostly began only in the early Islamic era. These traders helped to connect the spice and silk markets of South East Asia and far east Asia with the Arabian kingdoms, Persian Empire and the Roman Empire. Some later founded dynasties, including the Sultanate of Pontianak, while others intermingled with existing kingdoms. These early communities adopted much of the local culture, and some disappeared entirely while others formed ethnically distinct communities.

More Arabs visited Malay Archipelago when Islam began to spread. Islam was brought to the region directly from Arabia (as well as Persia and Gujarat), first to Aceh. One of travelers who had visited Indonesia was the Moroccan traveler Ibn Battuta who visited Samudra Pasai in 1345-1346 CE. According to Muslim Chinese writer Ma Huan who visited north coast of Java in 1413–15, he noted three kinds of people there: Chinese, local people and Muslims from foreign kingdoms in the West (Mideast) who have migrated to the country as merchants.

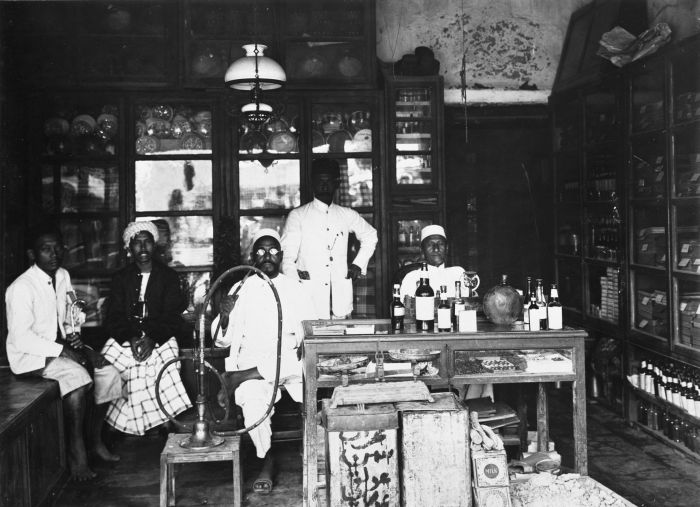
An Arab store in Java circa 1910–1930

Modern Arab Indonesians are generally descended of Hadhrami immigrants, although there are also communities coming from Arabs of Egypt, Sudan, Oman, and Arab States of the Persian Gulf area as well as non-Arab Muslims from Turkey or Iran. The Arabs and some of non-Arabs arrived during the Ottoman expedition to Aceh, which consisted of Egyptians, Swahili, Somalis from Mogadishu, and Indians from various cities, and states. They were generally from upper strata and classified as "foreign orientals" (Vreemde Oosterlingen) along with Chinese Indonesians by the Dutch colonists, which led to them being unable to attend certain schools and restricted from travelling, and having to settle in special Arab districts, or Kampung Arab. These laws were repealed in 1919. As liaison and to lead the community, the Dutch government appointed some Kapitan Arabs in the districts.

The community elites began to build economic power through trade and real estate acquisition, buying large amounts of real estate in Batavia (modern-day Jakarta), Singapore and other parts of the archipelago. Through charity work and "conspicuous consumption", they built and protected their social capital; eventually, some Arab Indonesians joined the Volksraad, the people's council of the Dutch East Indies.

During the Indonesian National Awakening, an Indonesian nationalist movement, Persatuan Arab Indonesia, founded by Abdurrahman Baswedan in 1934, promoted the idea of gradual cultural assimilation of Arab Indonesians into wider Indonesian society, which Baswedan referred to as "cultural reorientation".

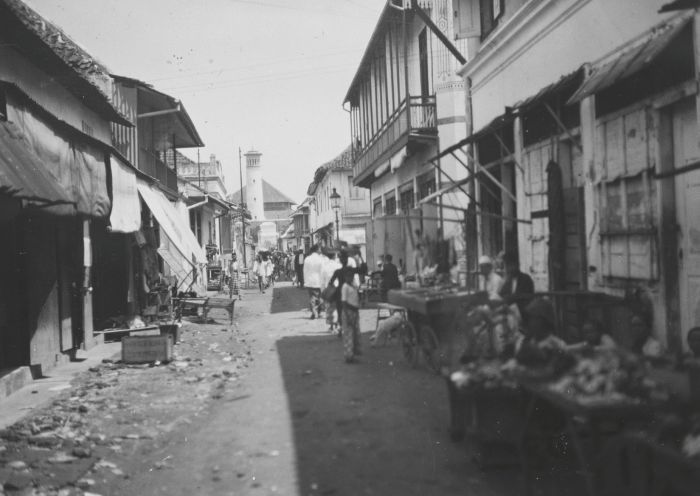
The Ampel Mosque at the end of a shopping street in the Arab quarter of Surabaya, January 14, 1927

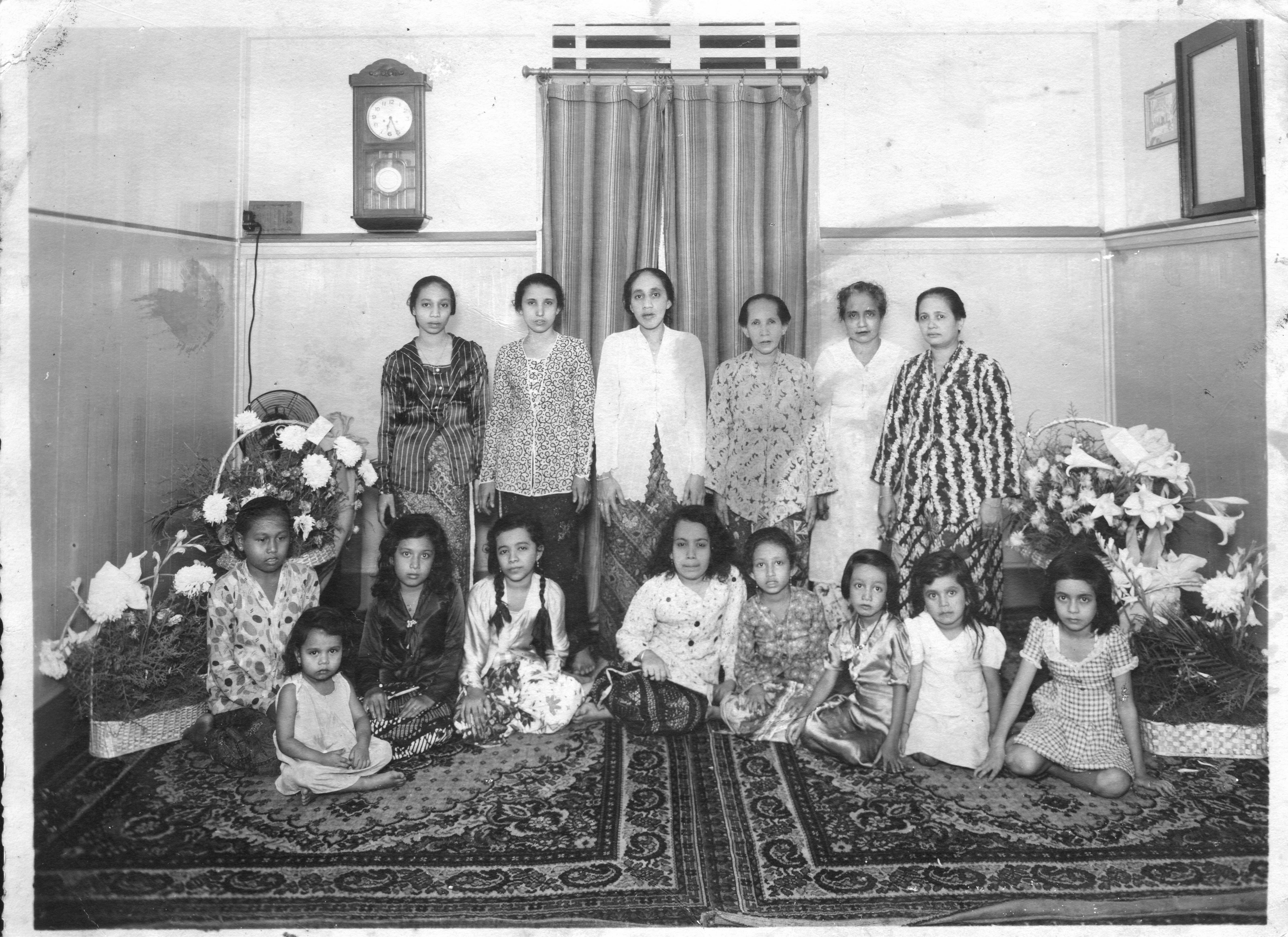
Women of Hadhrami descent in Palembang in 1940s

== Identity ==
First generation immigrants are referred to as wulayātī or totok. They are a small minority of the Arab Indonesian population. The majority, muwallad, were born in Indonesia and may be of mixed heritage.

Because of the lack of information, some Indonesian scholars have mistaken the Arabs of Indonesia as agents of Salafism and Wahhabism, as Azyumardi Azra depicted Indonesians of Arab descent as wishing to purge Indonesian Islam of its indigenous religious elements. Indonesian critics of Arab influence in Indonesia point to the founding of the radical group Jemaah Islamiyah (JI) and leadership of Laskar Jihad (LJ) by Arab Indonesians.

== Distribution ==
The majority of Arab Indonesians live in Java and Madura, usually in cities or relatively big towns such as Jakarta, Pekalongan, Cirebon, Surakarta, Kudus, Yogyakarta, Gresik, Pasuruan, or Surabaya. A sizeable population is also found in Sumatra (primarily in Palembang, and some in West Sumatra, North Sumatra, Riau, and Aceh). The earliest census figures that indicate the number of Hadhramis living in Dutch East Indies date from 1859, when it was found that there were 4,992 Arab Indonesians living in Java and Madura. The census of 1870 recorded a total of 12,412 Arab Indonesians (7,495 living in Java and Madura and the rest in other islands). In 1900, total number of Arab population 27,399, 44,902 in 1920, and 71,335 in 1930. Census data shows 87,066 people in 2000, and 87,227 people in 2005, who identified themselves as being of Arab ethnicity, representing 0.040% of the population. The number of Indonesians with partial Arab ancestry, who do not identify as Arab, is unknown.

== Religion ==
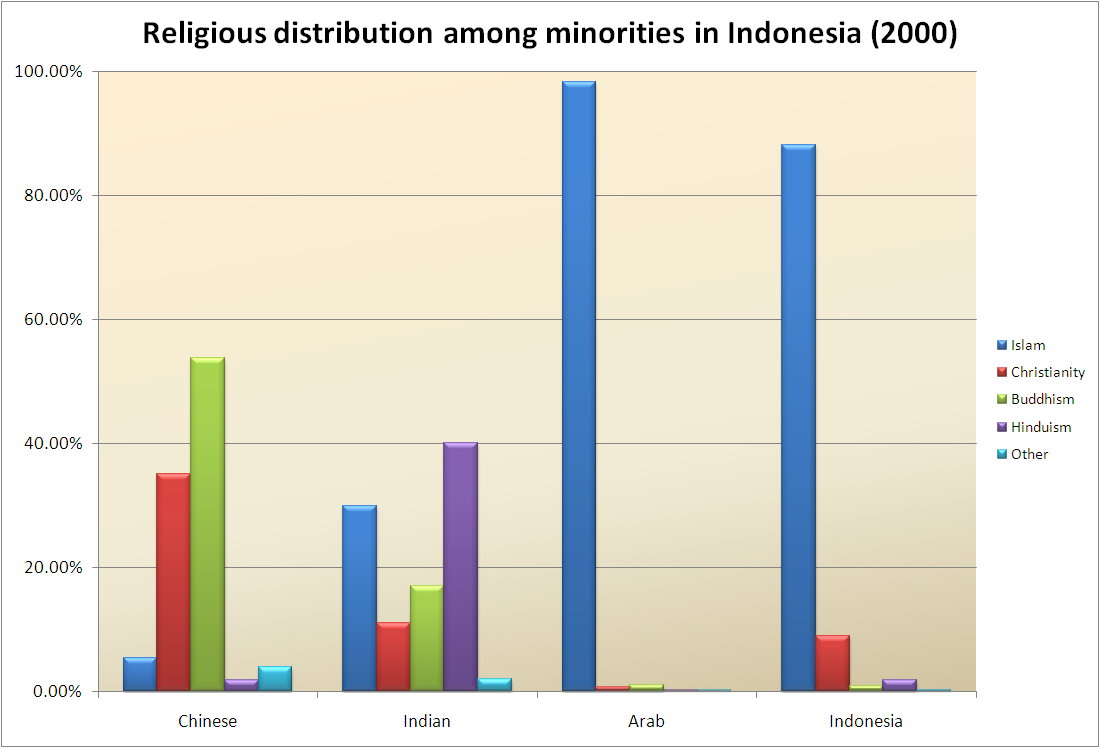
Arab Indonesians (second from right) had a higher proportion of Muslims than other ethnic groups.

Arab Indonesians are almost all Muslim; according to the 2000 census. Historically, most have lived in so called Kauman villages, in the areas around mosques, but this has changed in recent years. The majority are Sunni, following the Shafi'i school of Islamic law with Ba 'Alawi sada families usually follow Ba 'Alawiyya tariqa.

The Islam practiced by Arab Indonesians tends to be more orthodox than the local, indigenous-influenced forms like abangan who do not follow some of the more restrictive Islamic practices. Children are generally sent to madrasahs, but many later advance their education to secular schools.

== Traditions ==
=== Music ===
Gambus is a popular musical genre among Arab-Indonesians, usually during weddings or other special events. The music is played by a music ensemble consisting of Lute, violins, Marawis, Dumbuk, Bongo drum, Tambourine, Suling (Indonesian version of Ney), and sometimes accompanied with Accordion, Electronic keyboard, Electric guitars, even drum kit. The Lute (Gambus) player (commonly called Muthrib) usually sings while playing the Lute. The music is very similar to Yemeni music with lyrics mainly in Arabic, similar to Khaliji music, where the rhythm is categorized as either Dahife, Sarh or Zafin. In the events, sometimes male-only dancers go to the middle in a group of two or three persons and each group takes turn in the middle of the song being played.

=== Cuisine ===
Just like the Chinese and the Indians, the Arabs also brought their own culinary traditions as well as cuisine to Indonesia.

The influence of Hadhrami immigrants in the Indonesian cuisine can be seen in the presence of Yemeni cuisine in Indonesia, such as Nasi kebuli, Mandi rice, Ka'ak cookie, Murtabak, or lamb Maraq (lamb soup or stew).

== Ancestry ==
As common among Middle-Eastern societies, genealogies are mainly patrilineal. Patrilinearity is even stronger in Sayyid families, where an offspring of non-Hadhrami man and Hadhrami woman is not considered a Sayyid. Many of the Hadhrami migrants came from places in Hadhramaut, such as Seiyun, Tarim, Mukalla, Shibam, Mukalla or other places in Hadhramaut.

=== DNA ===
Very few researches and DNA samples, if any, have been done on Arab-Indonesians. It has been guessed that the DNA haplogroups found among Arab Indonesians are J, L and R with higher possibility of J-M267 traces. Haplogroup G-PF3296 is also common, especially among descents of Sayyids of Hadhramaut. It is predicted the presence of mtDNA R9 haplogroups among Arab Indonesians due to mixed marriage between Indonesians and Yemenis.

== Notable Arab Indonesians ==
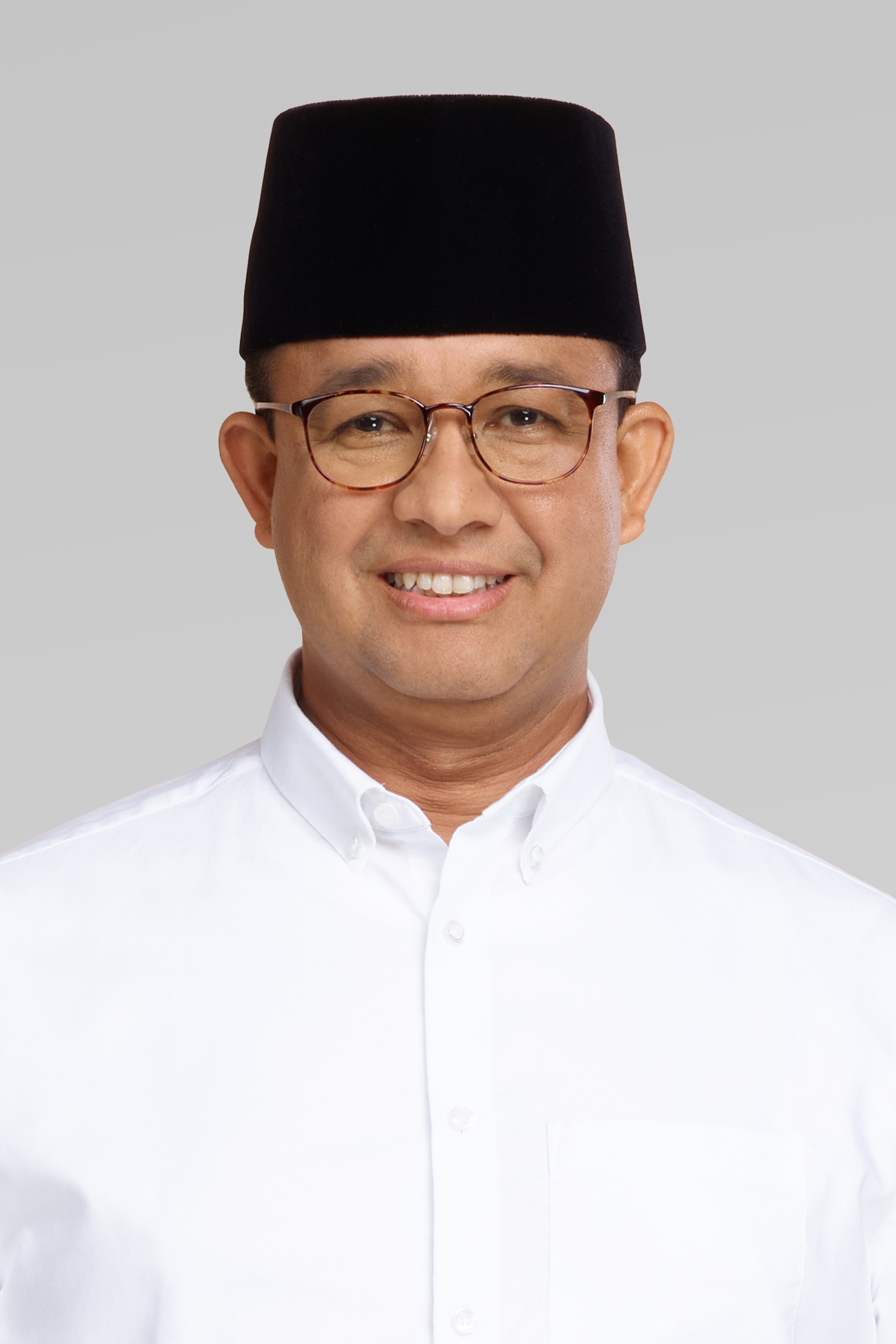
Anies Baswedan, former governor of Jakarta

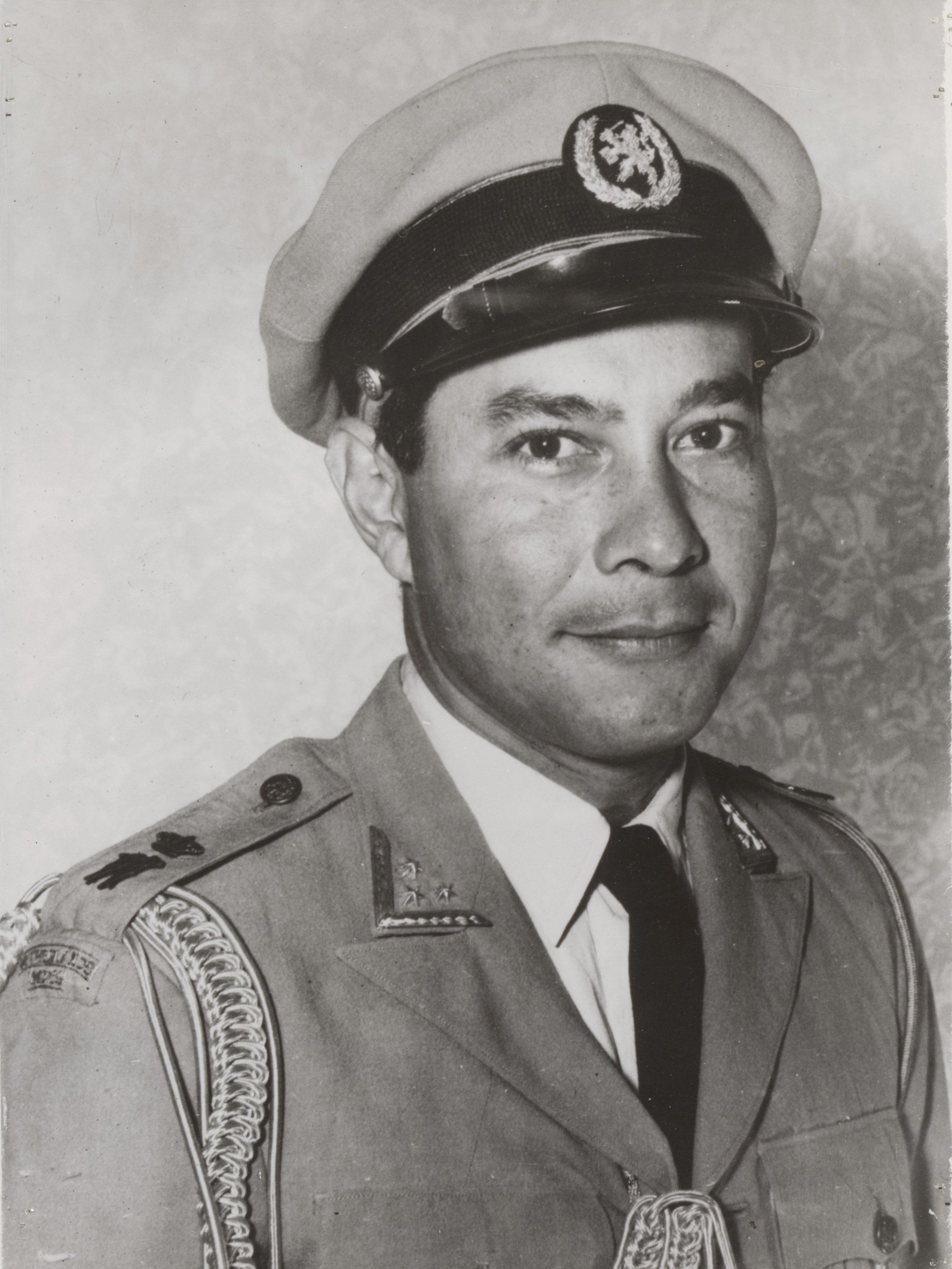
Syarif Hamid Alkadrie, Arab-Indonesian Sultan of Pontianak in Borneo, 1950.

- Abdurrahman Baswedan, diplomat, Indonesian freedom fighter and the founder of Persatoean Arab-Indonesia
- Abu Bakar Bashir, suspected head of Jemaah Islamiyah
- Ahmad Albar, rock singer
- Ahmad Surkati of Sudan, founder of al-Irsyad.
- Ali Alatas (half-Sundanese), former Minister of Foreign Affairs
- Alwi Shihab (half-Buginese), special envoy for the Middle East
- Anies Baswedan, educator, Minister of Education (2014–2016), Governor of Jakarta (2017–2022), relative of Abdurrahman Baswedan and Novel Baswedan
- Fadel Muhammad, former governor of Gorontalo and Deputy Speaker of People's Consultative Assembly
- Fuad Hassan, minister of education and culture
- Habib Ali Kwitang, Islamic cleric and founder of the Islamic Center of Indonesia
- Usman bin Yahya, Mufti of Batavia
- Habib Munzir Al-Musawa, preacher
- Haddad Alwi, Nasheed singer
- Haidar Bagir, scholar and businessman
- Hamid Algadri, figure in the Indonesian National Revolution and member of parliament
- Jafar Umar Thalib, founder of Laskar Jihad
- Muhammad Rizieq Shihab, founder of FPI
- Munir Said Thalib, Human Rights activist
- Nurhayati Ali Assegaf, politician
- Quraish Shihab (half-Buginese), Islamic scholar
- Raden Saleh, painter in Dutch East Indies era
- Said Naum, Kapitan Arab, a philanthropist
- Syarif Hamid II of Pontianak, Sultan of Pontianak Sultanate

== See also ==
- Arab diaspora
- Arab Malaysian
- Arab Singaporean

== Gallery ==
Arab Indonesians

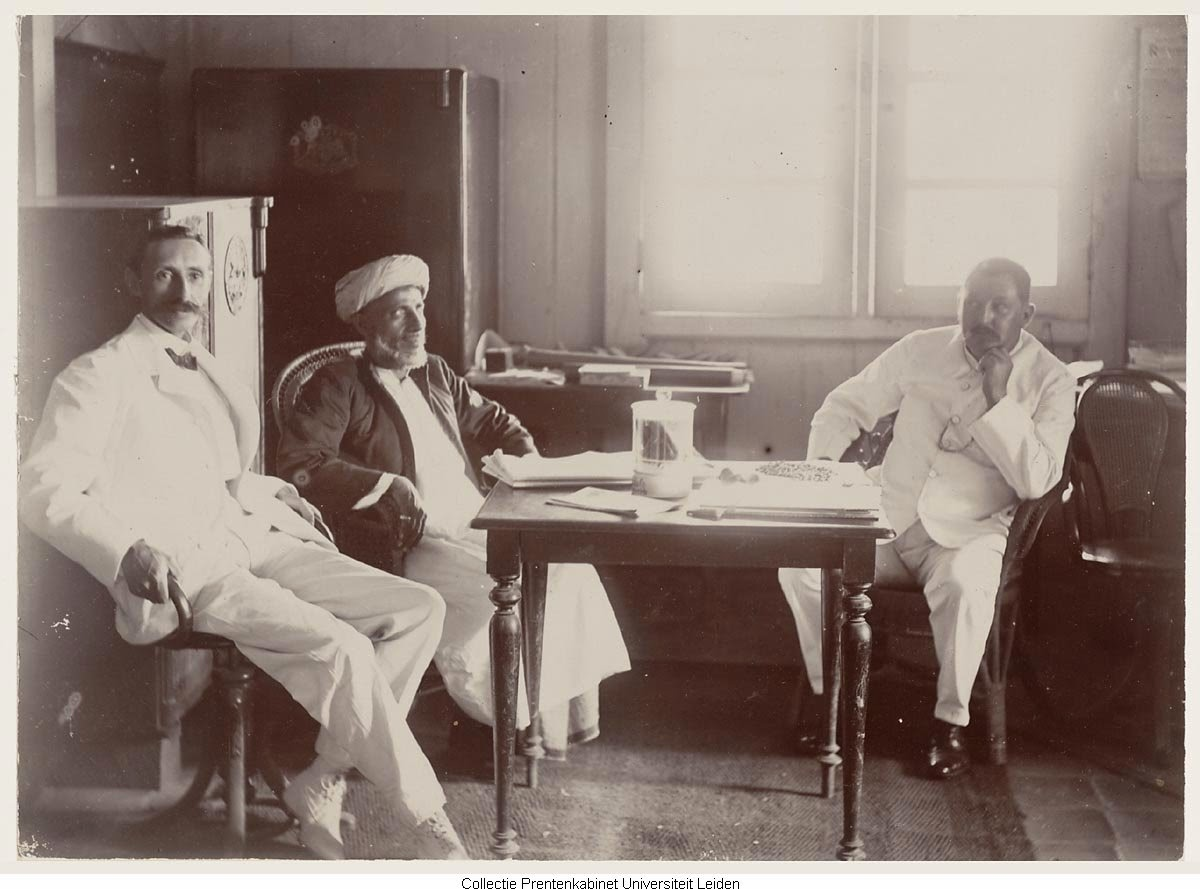
Indonesian Arab of Talise

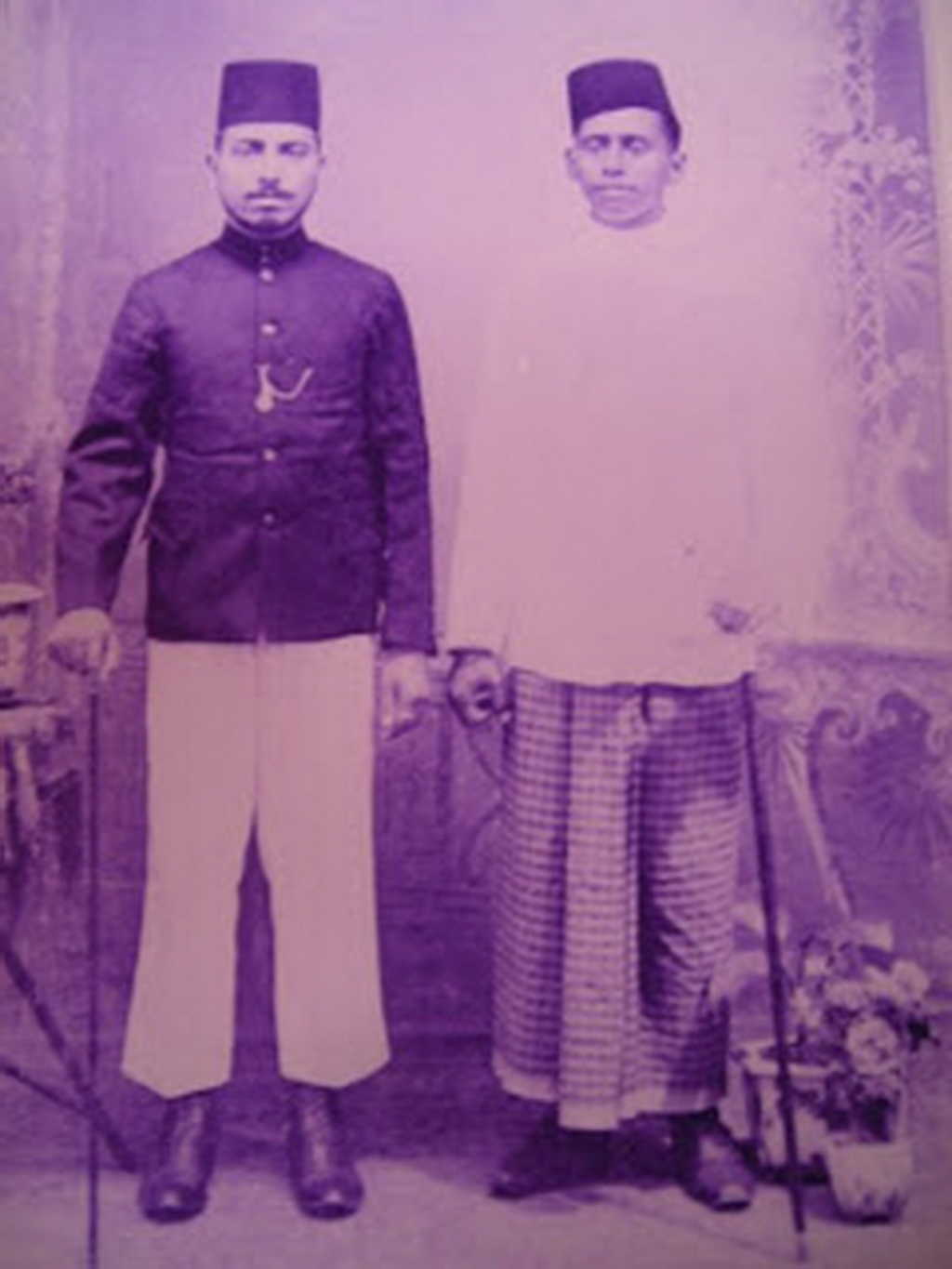
Kapitan Arab in Borneo

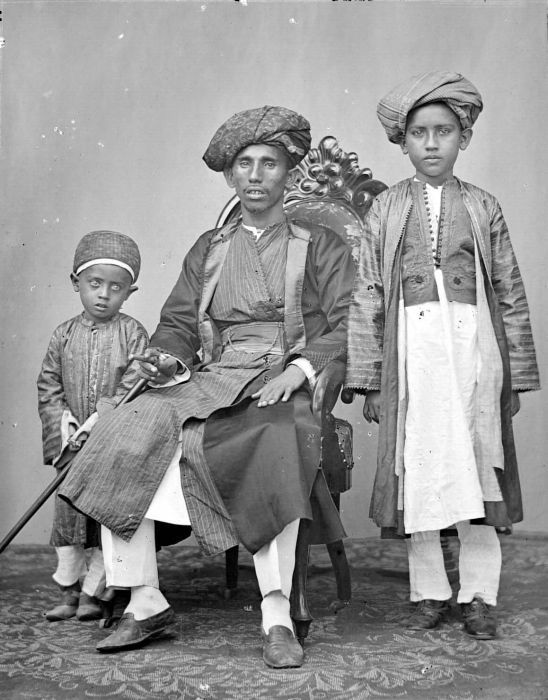
Kapten Arab of Tegal, Central Java

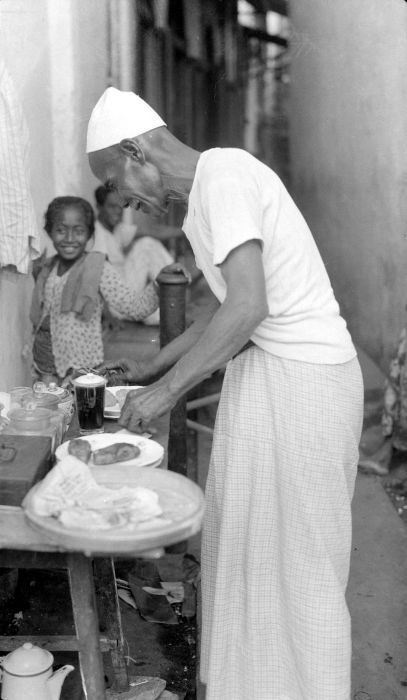
Arab Indonesian from Surabaya

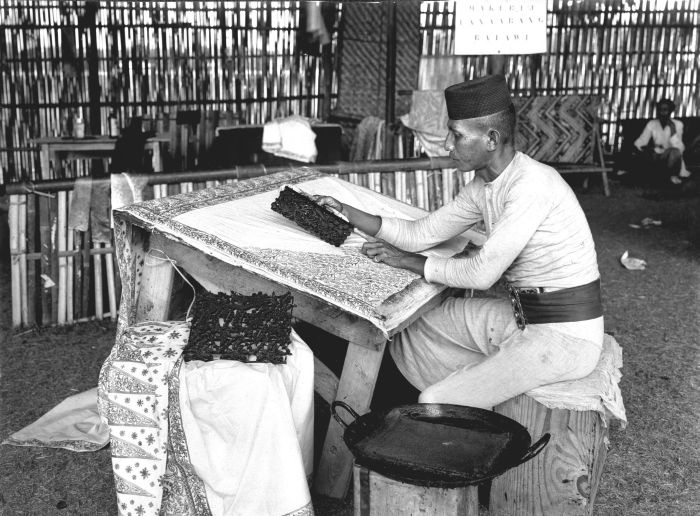
An Arab Indonesian working on batik wax stamps to work in Tanah Abang

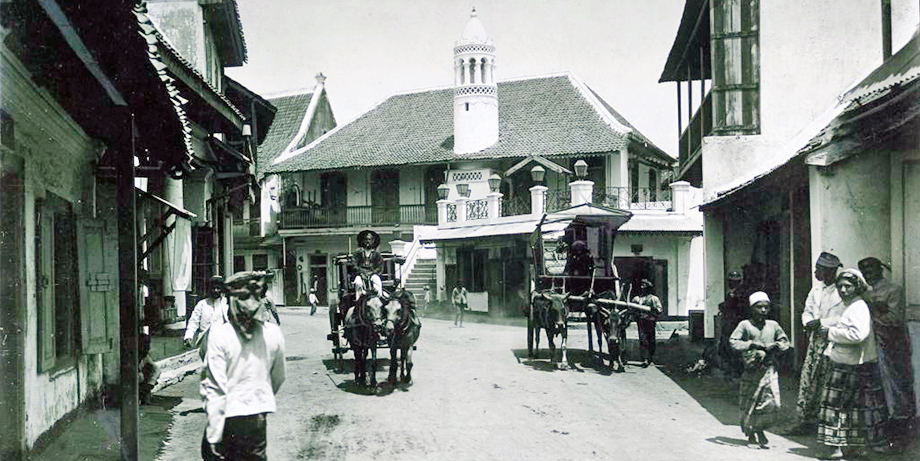
Hadhrami Arab neighborhood in Ampel, Surabaya, 1880

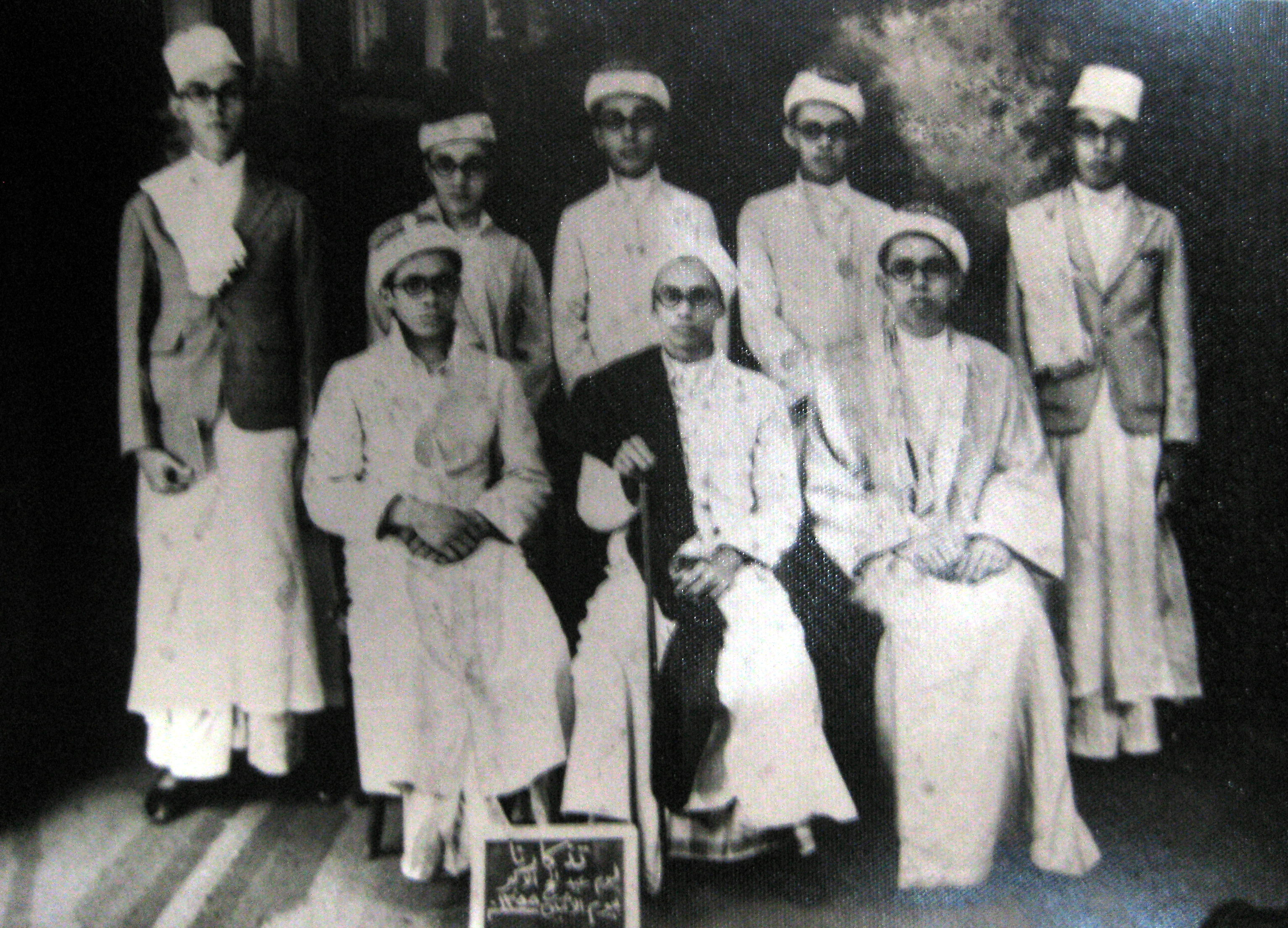
Hadhrami People on Eid al-Adha day in Palembang, February 1937 CE

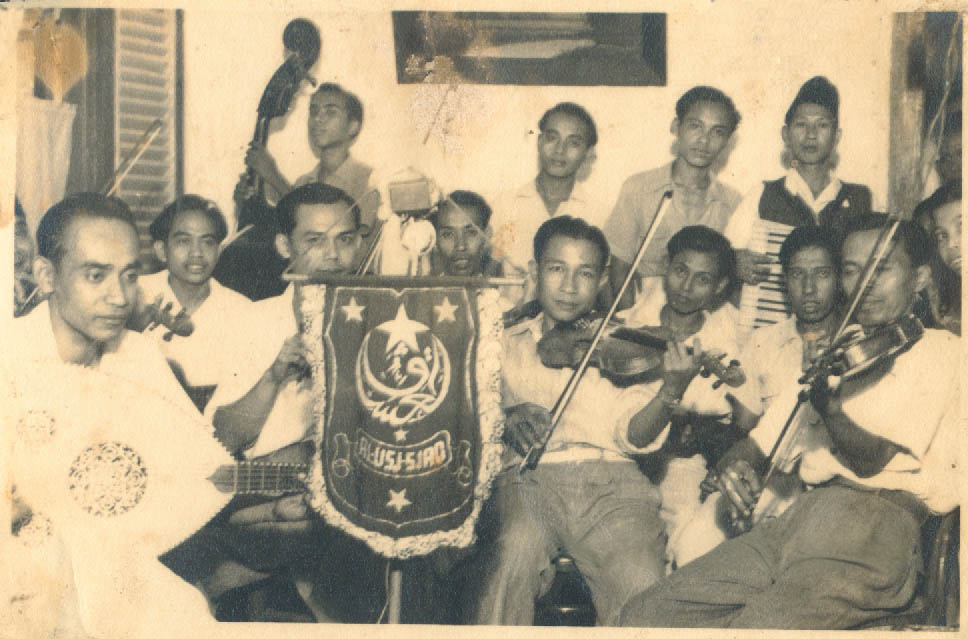
Arab-Indonesian musicians in Jakarta, 1949
