= Salafy (magazine) =

Salafy magazine is an Indonesian Islamist publication whose target audience is students. It is published by Pondok Pesantren Ihya'As-Sunnah (Yogyakarta). Scholars have identified it is as one of the key publications that helped spread radical Islam throughout Indonesia. Jafar Umar Thalib, founder of Laskar Jihad, contributed to the first issue.
