= Abdurrahman Baswedan =

Indonesian independence activist (1908–1986)

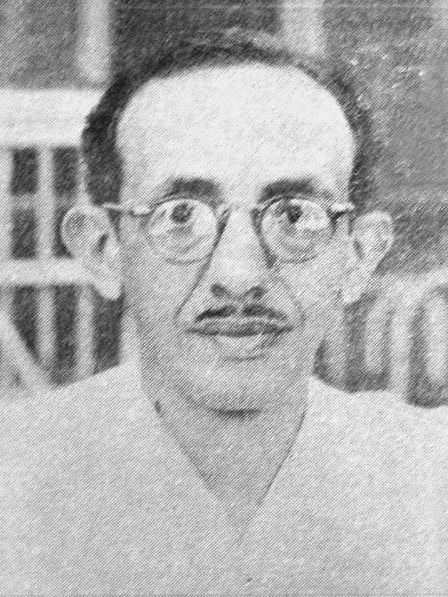

2nd Deputy Minister of Information
- In office 2 October 1946 – 3 July 1947
- President: Sukarno
- Prime Minister: Sutan Sjahrir
- Preceded by: Ali Sastroamidjojo
- Succeeded by: Position removed

Personal details
- Born: 9 September 1908 Ampel, Soerabaja, Dutch East Indies
- Died: 16 March 1986 (aged 77) Jakarta, Indonesia
- Resting place: Taman Kusir Cemetery
- Spouses: Sjaichun (1948–1950); Barkah Ganis (1950–1986)
- Children: 11
- Relatives: Anies Baswedan (grandson); Novel Baswedan (grandson)

Abdurrahman Baswedan, also known as AR Baswedan (Arabic: عبد الرحمن باسويدان ʿAbd ar-Raḥman bā swaydān; 9 September 1908 – 16 March 1986) was a nationalist, journalist, Indonesian freedom fighter, diplomat, and writer. Baswedan was a member of the Central Advisory Council during the Japanese occupation of the Dutch East Indies and of the Investigating Committee for Preparatory Work for Independence (BPUPK), served as Deputy Minister of Information of the Third Sjahrir Cabinet, a member of the Central Indonesian National Committee Working Group (Badan Pekerja Komite Nasional Indonesia Pusat, BP KNIP), a member of parliament, and also a member of the Indonesian Constitutional Assembly. Baswedan was one of Indonesia's first diplomats who successfully gained de jure and de facto international recognition for the Republic of Indonesia (from Egypt). He was awarded the title of National Hero of Indonesia in 2018.

== Independence Fighter ==
In August 1934, Semarang based daily newspaper "Matahari" published an article on Indonesians of Arab descent, calling them to unite in supporting Indonesia's independence. Baswedan himself was of Arab descent, but he spoke with a strong East Javanese accent. He called for people of Arab descent living in Indonesia to adhere to the principle: "di mana saya lahir, di situlah tanah airku." (Where I was born, is where my homeland is) His picture on the article conveyed the message strongly as he was wearing a blangkon (Javanese traditional hat).

On 4 October 1934, after the publication of an article, accusing Arab-Indonesians of supporting the Dutch colonists, Baswedan gathered ethnic Arabs in Semarang. In the gathering, they declared the Arab-Indonesian Youth Pledge, which proclaimed Indonesia as their motherland, and their commitment to support the fight for Indonesia's independence. In repercussion to the congress, the Indonesian Arab Party (Partai Arab Indonesia, PAI) was established and Baswedan was elected as its chairman. To focus on the political struggle, he left his well-paid job at the Matahari daily newspaper being paid 120 guldens, worth 24 quintal of rice.

== Journalism ==
Baswedan was a tough journalist who worked not for money. His decision to leave Matahari was not the only display of his commitment. He moved from the Sin Tit Po Newspaper which paid him 75 gulden to dr. Soetomo's Soeara Oemoem which only able to pay him 10-15 gulden. For his exemplary character, Soebagio IN put him in the list of 111 Indonesia's national press pioneers.

As a patriot-journalist, Baswedan wrote actively. He was widely known as a writer, poet, and artist. His speech attracted many and he was also an expert in drama art. Apart from Bahasa Indonesia, he mastered Arabic, English, and Dutch. Some of his published books are Debat Sekeliling PAI (Debates Surrounding the Indonesian Arab Party, 1939), Sumpah Pemuda Indonesia Keturunan Arab (Youth Pledge of Arab Indonesians, 1934), and Rumah Tangga Rasulullah (The Prophet's Household, 1940). He also wrote a five-stage drama story titled Menuju Masyarakat Baru (Toward a New Society). Other than his own publications, his ideas and visions were published by the secretary general of PAI, Salim Maskati.

== Diplomat ==
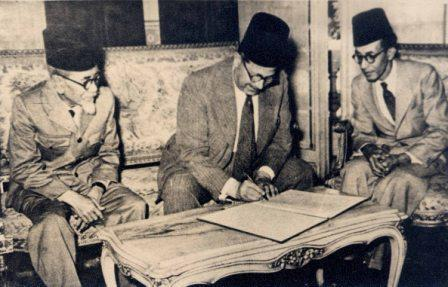
From right, Abd al-Rahman Baswedan (Indonesian Minister of Information), Mahmoud Fahmi al-Naqrashi Pasha (Egyptian Prime Minister and Foreign Minister), and Agus Salim (Indonesian Minister of Foreign Affairs) sign a friendship treaty between Egypt and Indonesia on 10 June 1947

His struggle continued in the new Republic. Together with Haji Agus Salim (Deputy Minister of Foreign Affairs), Rasyidi (Secretary General of the Ministry of Religious Affairs), Mohammad Natsir and St. Pamuncak, AR Baswedan departed to Arab countries as Indonesia's first diplomatic delegation. The delegation gained historical success with Egypt becoming one of the first countries to give de facto and de jure recognition to the fledgling Republic. This diplomatic success, after long negotiation in the Arab League, was soon followed by recognition by other countries.

== Personal life ==
Baswedan was born on 9 September 1908 in Ampel Village, Surabaya, as the third of four sons of Awad Baswedan (1879–1925), an Arab-Indonesian Muwallad of Hadhrami descent from a non-Sayyid family, and Aliyah binti Abdullah Jarhum (died 1918). His brothers were Ibrahim (1901–1944), Ahmad (1902–1964), and Umar (1914–1976). Baswedan also had two half-brothers, Abdullah (1914–1950) and Salim Baswedan (born 1916), and a half-sister, Mariam (1920–1987), from his father fourth marriage to Halimah. His paternal grandfather, Umar bin Muhammad bin Abdullah, immigrated from Yemen to Dutch East Indies. He received his early education at Madrasah Al-Khairiyah near Ampel Mosque in Surabaya, later continued his education under Sheikh Ahmad Surkati at the al-Irshad school in Batavia. Not finishing his studies at al-Irshad, he went back to Surabaya to be close with his father and studied with Sayyid Ahmad bin Hashim at the Hadhramaut School in Surabaya, where pro-sayyid practices such as taqbil was maintained. He became active at al-Irshad in Surabaya in the late 1920s, but resigned from his executive position of its Youth wing in June 1930.

As a child, he and his muwallad friends used to tease the Totok Arabs (Wulaytis) in the street. In Baswedan's view, the social distance between Wulayti and Muwallad groups was a result of differing conditions of their respective places of birth.

One of AR Baswedan's legacies was his book collection of more than 5000 books. As his will, the front room of his house in Yogyakarta was converted into a public library with his book collection in various languages (Arab, Dutch, English, Indonesia) were on display, arranged well with a modern catalogue. General public, particularly students, can easily access these books.

Throughout his life, AR Baswedan was actively engaging the youth. Some youth figures known to be close with him were Ahmad Wahib, Anhar Gonggong, Emha Ainun Najib, Gunawan Mohamad, Lukman Hakiem (PPP), Syu’bah Asa, Taufiq Effendi, WS Rendra, and most of the young activists during the 1960s to 1980s.

AR Baswedan was a humble fighter who never thought about material gains. Until his last days, AR Baswedan did not even own a house. He and his family were living in a borrowed house in Taman Yuwono complex in Yogyakarta, a complex which was lent by Haji Bilal for the freedom fighters when Yogyakarta was Indonesia's capital. His car was a gift from his friend Adam Malik (when he was vice president) for his 72nd birthday.

Baswedan was married to Syeikhun in 1925 and has had nine children: Anisah, Aliyah, Fuad, Awad Rasyid (1934–2013), Hamid, Atika, Nur, Imlati, and Lukyana. He then married for a second time to Barkah and has had two children, Havied Natsir and Ahmad Samhari.

== Sources ==
- (in English) Huub De Jonge, Abdul Rahman Baswedan and the Emancipation of the Hadramis in Indonesia, Asian Journal of Social Science, Volume 32, Number 3, 2004, pp. 373–400(28)
- (in Indonesian) Alwi Shahab, Sumpah Pemuda Arab, republika.co.id, 16 September 2007.
- (in English) Howard Dick, Surabaya the City of Work, a socioeconomic History 1900–2000, Center for International Studies, Ohio University, 2002.
- (in Indonesian) Suratmin, Abdurrahman Baswedan; Karya dan Pengabdiannya, Departemen Pendidikan dan Kebudayaan, Departemen Pendidikan dan Kebudayaan, Direktorat Sejarah dan Nilai Tradisional Proyek Inventarisasi dan Dokumentasi Sejarah Nasional Jakarta, 1989, hal 49–50.
- (in Indonesian) Apa dan Siapa; Abdur Rahman Baswedan, Pusat Data dan Analisa Tempo, www.pdat.co.id.
- (in Indonesian) Alwi Shahab, Partai Arab Indonesia, republika.co.id, 6 Januari 2002.
- (in Indonesian) Awal Sejarah Besar Itu dalam Profil Jama’ah Shalahuddin UGM, www.js.ugm.ac.id.
- (in Indonesian) Lihat catatan pendahuluan Djohan Effendi dalam buku Pergolakan Pemikiran Islam, Catatan Harian Ahmad Wahib yang diterbitkan Pustaka LP3ES, Jakarta, cetakan keenam, Februari 2003.
- (in Indonesian) AR Baswedan Dalam Pergerakan Nasional
- (in Indonesian) Sumpah Pemuda Arab
- (in Indonesian) Aljazair Anugerahkan Medali kepada 13 Tokoh RI
