= Indonesia Arab Association =

Indonesian association of ethnic Arabs

Arab Indonesian Association
- Persatuan Arab Indonesia
- Logo of the PAI

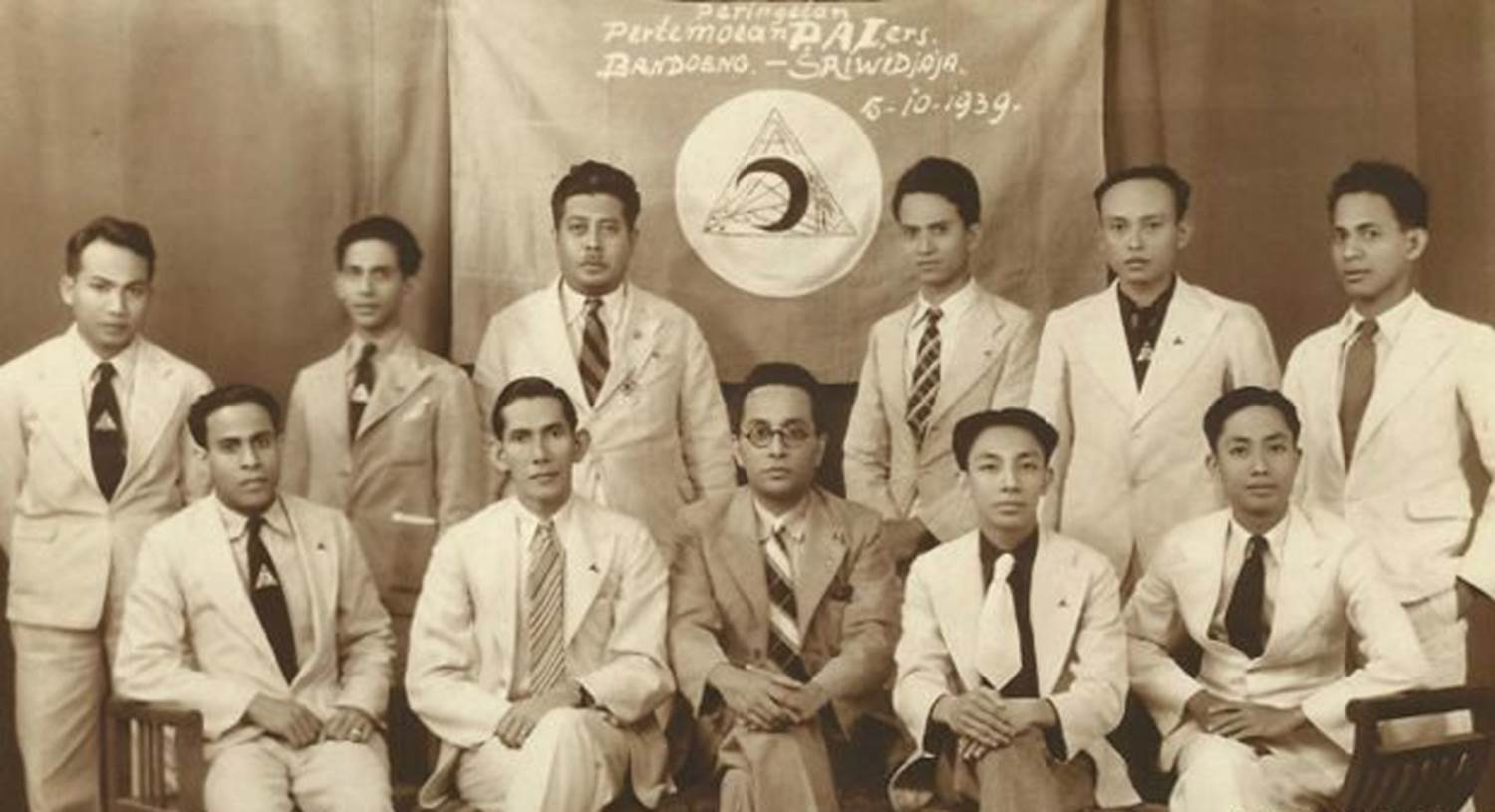
- PAI exponent branch meeting in Palembang and Bandung, 1939
- Abbreviation: PAI
- Formation: October 4, 1934; 92 years ago
- Founder: Abdurrahman Baswedan
- Dissolved: 1945; 81 years ago
- Location: Semarang
- First chairman: Abdurrahman Baswedan

The Indonesia Arab Association (Indonesian: Persatuan Arab Indonesia) (PAI) is an association of Arab Indonesians founded by Abdurrahman Baswedan in 1934 in Semarang to encourage the allegiance of Arab immigrants to Indonesia.

== History ==
On October 4, 1934 a group of forty Muwallads met in Semarang. After three days of vigorous debate they announced the establishment of a new organization called Persatoean Arab Indonesia. Originally the association was intended to encourage Arab Indonesians, mostly Muwallads, to integrate, assimilate and pledge allegiance to Indonesia which was still under ruling of Netherlands as Dutch East Indies. The association later joined the political party Gabungan Politik Indonesia (GAPI) in 1939-1940. Meanwhile, a separate association called Indo-Arabische Beweging found in 1930, in other hand, tried to continue the separate status of Arab immigrants as foreign orientals established by the Dutch government.

Members of the association came from different background and organizations, mainly from Al-Rabithah al-Alawiyah and al-Irshad. The first management of the organization consisted of Abdurrahman Baswedan of Al-Irshad as the chairman, Nur Al-Kaff of Al-Rabithah al-Alawiyyah as the secretary I, Salim Maskatee of Al-Irshad as the secretary II, Segaf al-Segof of Al-Rabithah al-Alawiyyah as the treasurer, and Abdurrahim Argubi of al-Irshad as the commissioner. The members of the association declared their oath affirming their allegiance to Indonesia as their homeland (rather than Hadhramaut) and Bahasa Indonesia as their mother tongue. The Arab-Indonesian youth also pledged three oaths ("Sumpah Pemuda Keturunan Arab"):

1. The motherland of Arab-Indonesians is Indonesia.
2. Arab-Indonesians should leave social isolation and exclusivity towards indigenous people of Indonesia
3. Arab-Indonesians should fulfill their obligations towards the motherland and the nation of Indonesia

PAI received supports from many nationalists through their newspapers such as chinese-Malay's newspaper Matahari or Sin Tit Po as one of the main supporters. However, the organization also received negative reactions from Arab Indonesians who were against it, many are of Wulayati group. Among the opponents were Ali bin Yahya of al-Rabithah al-Alawiyyah who frequently published his oppositions on Arabic magazine Al-Salam, and MBA Alamoudi, an Ambon-born Arab Indonesian, who strongly attacked the organization on the weekly periodical Al-Yaum in Indonesian published by Arabische Verbond. The counter parties use all means and threats to prevent the development and influences of PAI, including firing the person out of his job or even expulsion by the father.

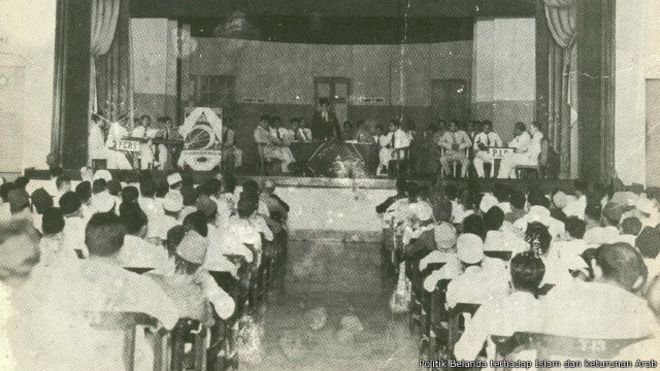
PAI Congress in Cirebon, 1940.

Among its prominent members were Abdurrahman Baswedan and Hamid Algadri.
