= PERSIS =

Islamic organization based in Bandung, West Java, Indonesia

Persatuan Islam
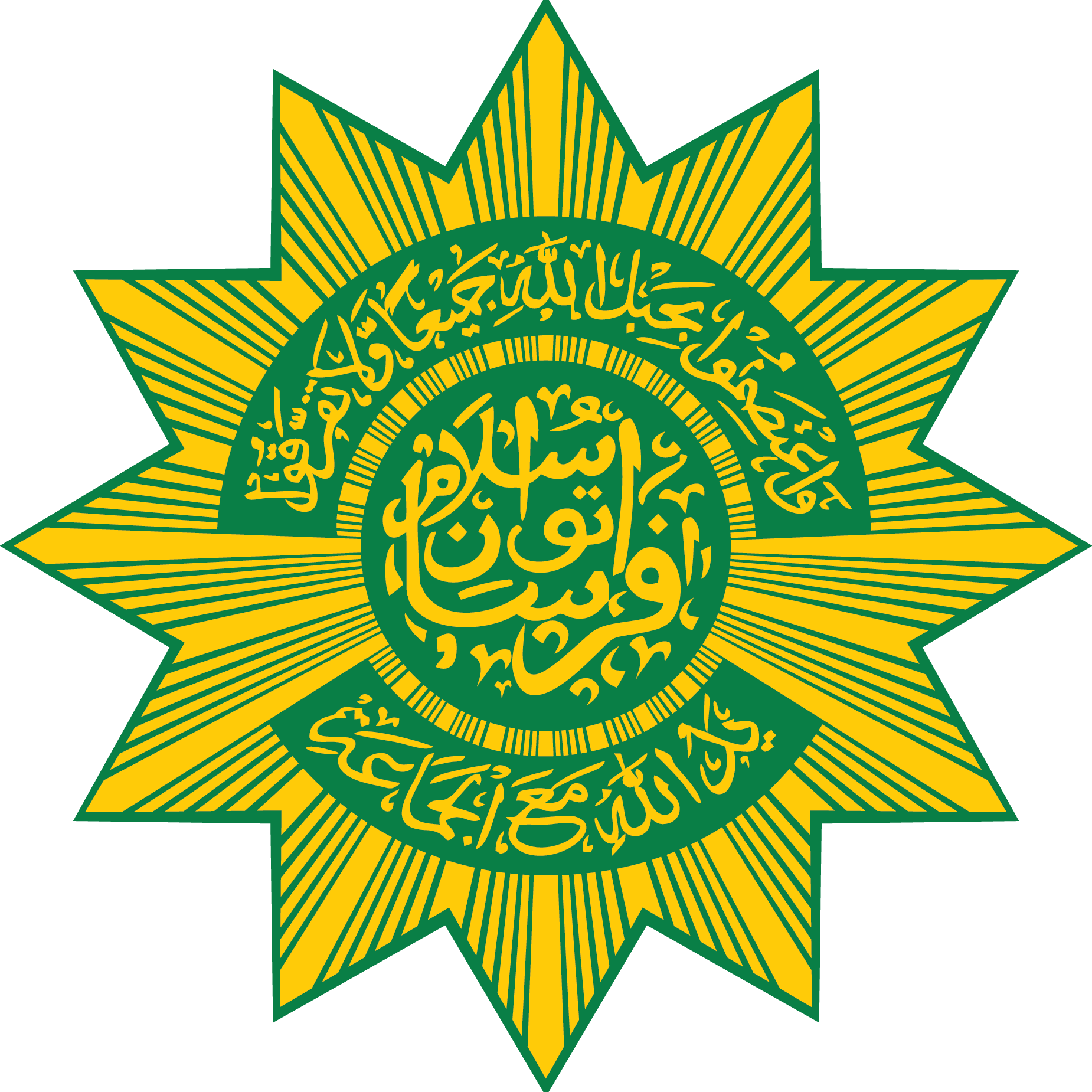
- Logo of PERSIS

- Zone of influence
- Abbreviation: PERSIS
- Formation: September 12, 1923 CE
- Founder: Zamzam, Muhammad Yunus, Ahmad Hassan
- Type: Foundation
- Purpose: Religious islamic; Education
- Headquarters: JL. Perintis Kemerdekaan, No.2, Bandung
- Location: Bandung, Indonesia
- Coordinates: 6.913732°S 107.608292°E
- Region served: Indonesia
- Leader: KH. Aceng Zakaria
- Website: https://persis.or.id/

Persatuan Islam (lit. 'Islamic Union', abbreviated PERSIS) is an Islamic organization in Indonesia founded on 12 September 1923 in Bandung by a group of Muslims who are interested in education and religious activities led by Haji Zamzam and Haji Muhammad Yunus.

== History ==
The idea started from an alumnus of Dar al-'Ulum in Mecca named H. Zamzam who since 1910-1912 CE was the religious teacher in the religious school Dar Al-Muta'alimîn. H. Zamzam founded the organization along with his close friend H. Muhammad Yunus. Both of them were born in Palembang. Muhammad Yunus, a trader who was quite successful, in his youth earned a traditional religious education and mastered the Arabic language, so he could self-taught through the scriptures of interests. The equal educational background and culture uniting them in Islamic discussions. The topics of their discussions were usually matters related to religious movements that were developing at the time, or religious matters published in the magazine al-Munir in Padang or in al-Manar magazine published in Egypt.

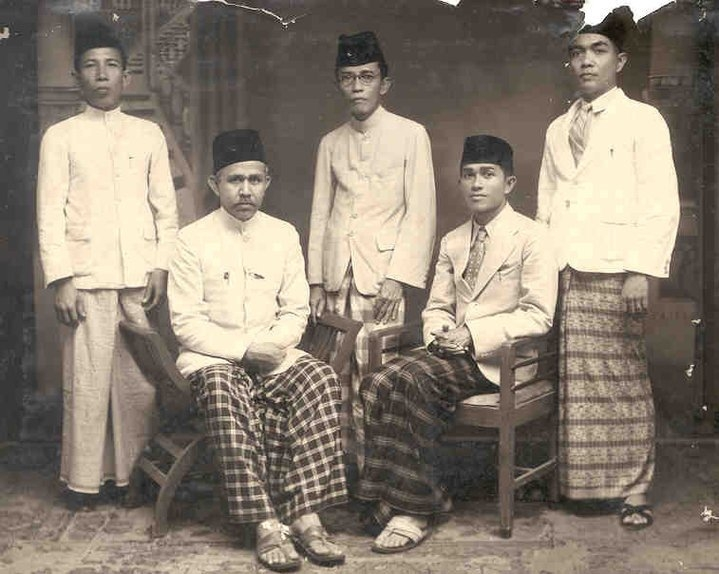
Figures of PERSIS organization (A.Hassan is second from the left)

One time, there was a discussion took place after an event festivity at the home of a family member, a native of Sumatra that had been living in Bandung. The matter of the discussion was about religious disagreement between al-Irshad and Jamiat Kheir. Since then, subsequent meetings transformed into a group of reviewers, a sort of club in the field of religious studies in which members of the group gladly reviewed, assessed, and tested the teachings they had received. Their discussions were also held with the Jum'ah prayer congregation, so the frequency increased and the discussion deepened. The number of people was originally only about 12 people. The discussions intensified and became not just limited to religious issues, but wider and more political, such as on the dichotomy between traditional and Islamic Modernism that was occurring at the time between scholars of Jamiat Kheir and al-Irshad in Batavia, or the issue of communist infiltration in Sarekat Islam (SI) and the efforts Muslims tried to confront it.

In 1924, Ahmad Hassan bin Ahmad (born in Singapore; December 31, 1887 CE – died in Surabaya, November 10, 1958 CE), a descant of Tamil father (Ahmad) and a Javanese Tamil mother (Muznah; she was born in Surabaya but her family originally was from Palekat in Madras), joined in the discussions at PERSIS. Hassan was smart and mastered Islamic Sciences and General knowledge at large as well as fluent in Arabic, English, Malay and Tamil language. He obtained religious education in Singapore and Johor, and enjoyed writing articles on Utusan Melayu newspaper published in Singapore.

In terms of naming, PERSIS from the beginning was liberal. At the time, it was uncommon for an Islamic organization to be named with Non-Arabic name. The abbreviated name of Persatuan Islam "PERSIS", which means Persian in Latin, was regarded as a westernized word influenced by the Dutch colonialism. Moreover, sanctity and identification of Islam with Arabic was very strong among Muslims at the time. This means that they were ready to accept the risk and to maintain the establishment and the confidence they had over the use of the Latin name, unlike prior organizations such as Jamiat Kheir, Muhammadiyah, and al-Irshad that all use Arabic names.

PERSIS transforms into a bolder and more extreme organization than the Muhammadiyah and al-Irshad in opposing heresy, myth and superstition that are considered Islamic. It also harshly criticizes Ba 'Alawi sada's adherence to taqlid and rejection of ijtihad, visitations of tombs (ziyarat) and consequent approval of saint worship, Kafa'ah between Sayyid women and non-Sayyid men, and the belief about elevated status of Arab Indonesians in the Indonesian Muslim community.

PERSIS publicity was gained mainly through printed media, with its first published magazine Pembela Islam published in October 1929 in Bandung. The publication lasted until 1933 and managed to publish 72 numbers with a circulation of 2,000 copies, spreading all over the country and even to Malaysia and Thailand.

In November 1931, PERSIS published a special magazine discussing issues of religion, without challenging the Non Muslim parties. The magazine was named al-Fatwa written in Jawi letters, resulting in more demand by the Muslims in Sumatra, Borneo and Malaysia. However, the publication of this magazine only lasted until October 1933 with 20 issues and 1000 copies. In 1935 The al-Fatwa was replaced with a new magazine called al-Lisaan that lasted in June 1942 with 65 as its last issue number. During the life of the al-Lisaan magazine, A. Hassan moved to Bangil, so issue number 47 (published in May 1940) to issue number 65 were published in Bangil, Pasuruan, East Java. Besides running the publishing house, A. Hassan also built a PERSIS boarding school in Bangil.

== Notable members ==
- Muhammad Isa Anshary; politician and a freedom fighter for Indonesian revolution.
- Mohammad Natsir; former prime minister of Indonesia
- Ahmad Hassan; a colleague of Sukarno in Bandung
- Haji Zamzam; One of the founders of PERSIS
- H. Eman Sar'an; Head of Hisbah council of PERSIS from 1990-2005
- Achyar Syuhada; prominent Ulama member of PERSIS
- Mohammad Yunus; Ulama member of Persis
- K.H. E. Abdurrahman; Chairman of PERSIS 1962-1983
- K.H A. Latif Muchtar; Chairman of PERSIS 1990 - 1997
- KH. Shiddiq Amien; Mba; Chairman of PERSIS 1997 - 2010
- K.H.Ikin Shadikin; Ulama and head of advisory council of PERSIS 2000 - 2011
- K.H. Usman Sholehudin; Head of Hisbah council of PERSIS
- K.H Prof Maman Abdurrahman, MA; chairman of PERSIS 2010-2015
- K.H. Aceng ZakariaL; chairman of PERSIS 2015-2020
- K.H. M. Romli; Head of Hisbah council of PERSIS 2015-2020
- K.H. Entang Muchtar ZAL; Ulama member

== See also ==
- Jamiat Kheir
- Muhammadiyah
- al-Irsyad
- Ahmad Surkati

== Bibliography ==
- Federspiel, Howard M. (June 1, 2001). Islam and Ideology in the Emerging Indonesian State: The Persatuan Islam (Persis), 1923 to 1957 (Social, Economic and Political Studies of the Middle East and Asia). Brill Academic Pub. ISBN 978-9004120471.
- Federspiel, Howard (August 1966). THE PERSATUAN ISLAM (Islamic Union). Montreal: Institute of Islamic Studies, McGill University.
- Noer, Deliar (March 2013). "The Modernist Muslim Movement in Indonesia, 1900–1942" (PDF). American Journal of Sociology. 118 (5). The University of Chicago Press: 1467–1473. doi:10.1086/670524.
- M. Federspiel, Howard (2009). Persatuan Islam Islamic Reform in Twentieth Century Indonesia. Equinox Publishing. pp. 78–79. ISBN 978-60283-9747-6.
