= Hamid Algadri =

Indonesian independence fighter and diplomat

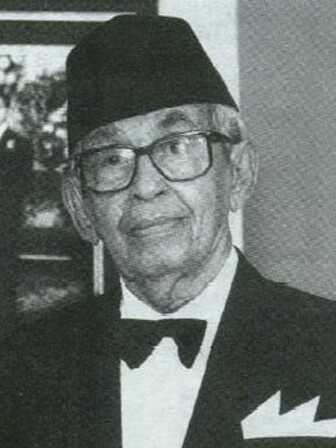
- Hamid Algadri
- Born: 10 July 1912; Pasuruan, Dutch East Indies
- Died: January 25, 1998 (aged 85); Jakarta, Indonesia
- Education: Universitas Indonesia
- Occupation: Politician
- Known for: National hero, Negotiator in Liggardjati, Renville and KMB agreements
- Notable work: Member of Constituent, diplomat
- Spouse: Zena binti Husein Alatas (m. 1942)
- Children: 4
- Relatives: Ali Algadri (brother); Rayya Makarim (granddaughter); Nadiem Makarim (grandson)

Hamid Algadri or Hamid Al-Gadri (Arabic: حامد القدرى, Arabic pronunciation: [ħa:mid al qadrij]; 1912-1998) was an Indonesian independence fighter and was meritorious in negotiating the Linggadjati Agreement, Renville Agreement, Dutch–Indonesian Round Table Conference (Konferensi Meja Bundar, KMB) and one of the members of parliament in the founding days of the Republic of Indonesia.

== Early life ==
Hamid was born in Pasuruan on July 10, 1912. In the beginning, he had difficulty in securing entry to a Dutch elementary school, Europeesche Lagere School due to his non-Caucasian race and age, succeeding only after his father lied about his age to look two years older and persistence of his grandfather by threatening to return his medal of Netherlands if Hamid was not admitted. His father was an Arab Muwallad named Muhammad, and his paternal grandfather named Alim Algadri, a Hadhrami descent born in Surat, India who married a local Indian woman and later migrated to East Java and was given the position as the Kapitan Arab in Pasuruan, a position in the colonial system solely for Arab Indonesians. He had a younger brother, Ali, a businessman and former diplomat who was born in 1918 and served as an Indonesian ambassador in Myanmar from 1949 until 1950. His grandfather started selling horses before becoming a successful businessman in real-estate. From this mixed family life, Hamid mastered Indonesian, Javanese and Urdu, besides Dutch from his formal education.

He received his basic education from ELS, which he continued to middle school (MULO) 1928 - 1933, and AMS (High school) majoring in Classical Western civilizations from 1933 to 1936. In 1930 Hamid affiliated himself in Jong Islamieten Bond (JIB) in Surabaya, a youth organization initiated by nationalist activists such as Agus Salim. He moved to Batavia in 1936 and became student in the Recht Hoge School (RHS, law school) in Batavia, but was unable to finish because the University was closed during Japanese occupation in 1942. After Indonesian Independence and with the initiative of Prof. Djokosoetono (the first Dean of the Faculty of Law at Universitas Indonesia and co-founder of Indonesian Police Academy), he was able to earn his master in de rechten (MR, Master in Law) in 1952. He was the first Arab-Indonesian who entered the university. At the university, Hamid was active in youth organizations within or outside campus, such as at Perhimpunan Pelajar-Pelajar Indonesia (PPPI, Indonesian Student Association), Indonesia Muda (Young Indonesia), Studenten Islam Studie Club, Unitas Studiosorum Indonesisensis and Baperpi (Badan Persatuan Pelajar Indonesia, Indonesian Student Association Board). His youth career was such as being an editor of USI magazine and as vice president of Baperpi.

While still as student, Hamid joined the Arab Union of Indonesia (Persatuan Arab Indonesia or PAI) which was established in 1934 by AR Baswedan.

== Career ==
Hamid Algadri worked in the Secretariat of the Prime Minister. One day he accompanied Prime Minister Sutan Sjahrir and his entourage in a special train going from Jakarta to Yogyakarta in the late 1945. Riding in the special train some high-ranking Indonesian officials such as Djokosutono, Tanuwijaya Djojohadikusomo and Didi Kartasasmita. He later moved to the Ministry of Foreign Affairs, later as Secretary of the Ministry of Information as well as a member of the Central Indonesian National Committee (KNIP).

When Sjahrir became head of KNIP, Hamid who was in Pasuruan was summoned and given the task to work in Jakarta. At that time Soedjatmoko, Soedarpo, Soebadio Sastrosatomo were called de jongens van Sjahrir (the children of Sjahrir). Hamid Algadri was also included in it and became member of the working committee of KNIP. During this period (1945 - 1949) he was also a high ranking official in the Ministry of Foreign Affairs, Executive secretary of the Ministry of Information under Minister Mohammad Natsir, and editor of Sikap, a political magazine of PSI.

At a young age in Jakarta, Hamid lived on 13 Serang street. Hamid was chosen as one of the advisors to the Indonesian delegation during the negotiations of the Renville Agreement and Linggadjati Agreement. When the Dutch military aggression (Operation Product) broke out on 21 July 1947, Hamid along with other members of the Republican delegation in Jakarta were arrested, but with the intervention of Willem Schermerhorn, the chairman of the General Commission of the Netherlands, they were released immediately. After the Renville Agreement was signed in January 1948, the Dutch began to establish smaller states such as State of East Sumatra, State of Madura, State of Pasundan and State of East Indonesia (NIT) to oppose the creation of united Indonesian republic. Hamid and Ali Budiardjo then co-founded the plebiscite movement for Indonesia to campaign to the west to win supports of western countries. The movement tried to thwart the establishment of the State of Pasundan, but was not successful.

He also participated in the Indonesian delegation as an adviser to the Round Table Conference (RTC) in The Hague in 1949. The RTC produced an agreement for transfer of sovereignty from the Netherlands to Indonesia in late December 1949. At the time Hamid was member of parliament in the Foreign Affairs Commission, and had frequent official visits to various countries in Asia and Europe. He was member of delegation to the United Nations, United Kingdom and Pakistan.

In 1952, Habib Bourguiba and Tayeb Salim of Neo Destour Party of Tunisia came to Indonesia to ask for help gaining independence from France. Then in 1956, Lakhdhar Brahimi and Muhammad Ben Yahya, from Algeria came asking for similar help. At that time Hamid was the Committee Chairman of the Foreign Affairs in the Indonesian parliament. He was officially given the responsibility to assist both groups, and he eventually became Secretary General of Algeria and Tunisia Aid Committee. Tunisia and Algeria asked for moral and material supports for their struggle from political parties. Indonesia, through Hamid's leadership, helped them by providing offices, cars, and a monthly allowance for their representatives in Jakarta, and by arranging that some foreign exchange from the sale of rubber were sent to them. Indonesia also sent an experienced guerrilla fighter, General Suwarto, to Algeria.

After the 1955 general election, he became chairman of the faction of the Socialist Party of Indonesia (PSI) in the Constituent Assembly in 1958, which convened in Bandung to write a new constitution. He voiced the disagreement of the PSI for the establishment of an Islamic state in Indonesia and after the talk failed to agreement of the proposed changes, the Constitutional Assembly agreed to back to 1945 constitution as an alternative way to overcome the crisis. On July 5, 1959, President Sukarno decreed the return to 1945 constitution and declared the dissolution of The Constitutional Assembly.

== Recognition ==
Hamid was recognized internationally by the countries of North Africa for his struggles and efforts for the independence of North African countries. He was awarded with the highest L'ordre de Nishan Iftikhar from the Republic of Tunisia on January 15, 1956, and was awarded the Wism Jumhuria on August 29, 1992. He was also awarded the Highest Order Masaf al-Istihqaq al-Wathani from Algeria on August 3, 1992. In his home country, he was awarded the Satya Lencana Wira Karya medal in 1978 and is recognized as a pioneer of freedom. When he was no longer the member of parliament, Hamid was active in the social activities, such as the director of the Yayasan Dana Bantuan (Assistance Fund Foundation), board member of Social Foundation to fight Tuberculosis, and board member of the Yayasan Bunga Kamboja (Kamboja Social Foundation).

== Personal life ==
Hamid was in the presiding board of PAI which was led by Hussein Alatas in 1942. He later married his daughter, Zena, who was 18 at that time. They held their wedding in small town of Pasuruan, but because many delegates and member of PAI come to congratulate them, it raised suspicion of Japanese Kenpeitai that the event was thought as a covertly political activity and about to be cancelled, but later was let to continue.

Hamid died of natural cause at Medistra hospital, Jakarta on January 25, 1998. He was buried in a simple ceremony led by then Minister of Foreign Affair Ali Alatas.
