= Jafar Umar Thalib =

Indonesian Cleric

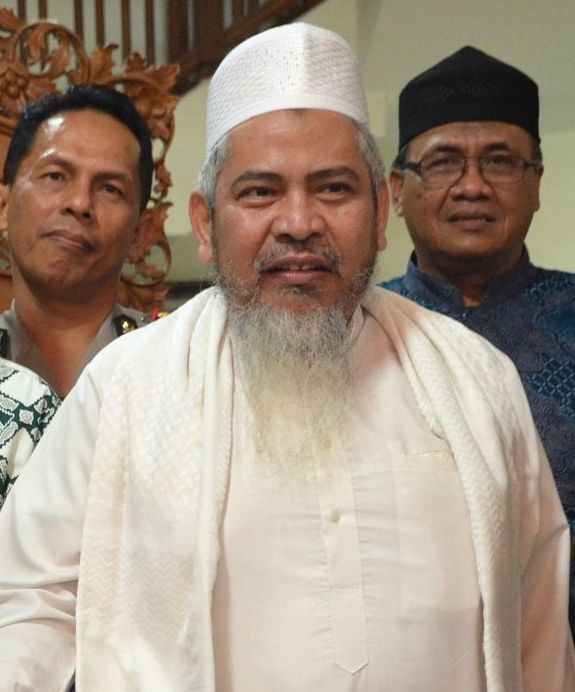
- Born: December 29, 1961; Malang, Indonesia
- Died: August 25, 2019 (aged 57); Jakarta, Indonesia
- Resting place: Yogyakarta
- Occupation: Islamic cleric
- Known for: Laskar Jihad Islamic organization
- Spouse: Venia Said Fuhaid
- Children: 9

Jafar Umar Thalib (Arabic: جَعْفَر عُمَر طَالِب; Arabic pronunciation: [dʒaʕfar ʕumar tˤaːlib]; December 29, 1961 – August 25, 2019) was an Indonesian Islamist cleric. He was the head of Laskar Jihad, an Islamist and anti-Christian militant organization active during the Maluku sectarian conflict.

== Case in Papua ==
Ja'far Umar Thalib was named a suspect and six of his followers after damaging the sound system of a resident named Henock Niki on Jalan Protocol Koya Barat, Muara Tami District, Jayapura, on Wednesday 27 February 2019, around 05.30 West Indonesia Time. The case began when Henock Niki played spiritual songs at high volume while Ja'far gave a lecture after the Fajr prayer. Then Ja'far and six of his followers came to Henock Niki's house and then destroyed the sound system using a samurai sword. As a result of this action, Ja'far was sentenced to 5 months in prison and six of his followers were sentenced to 6 months in prison.

== Family ==
Ja'far Umar Thalib was born on December 29, 1961 in Malang, Indonesia. His ancestors comes from Yemen. Ja'far's grandfather Abdullah bin Amir bin Thalib was a great and respected cleric in Yemen in the mid-19th century Ja'far's grandfather migrated to Asia. Had been left in several countries in asia and finally settled in Madura and married the son of the village head and had a child named Umar Thalib, father of Ja'far Umar Thalib who was a teacher at a teacher in Al-Irshad Al-Islamiya school which is known to be strict and disciplined in educating its children. Ja'far was born on December 29, 1961, in Malang City, East Java, Ja'far was the last child of Umar Thalib and Badriyah Saleh.

== Education ==
Thalib was educated as a child at PERSIS Islamic boarding school in Bangil and at the Al-Irshad Al-Islamiya school, until later in 1983 he became a student at LIPIA (معهد العلوم الإسلامية والعربية في إندونيسيا Ma'had al-ʻulumi al-Islamiyyah wal 'arabiyah fi Indunisia, Islamic and Arabic College of Indonesia) in Jakarta, which is a branch of the Imam Muhammad ibn Saud Islamic University In Riyadh, Saudi Arabia. Due to some dissension with one of his teachers, Muhammad Yasin al-Khattib, he left LIPIA. With the help of the LIPIA director, he continued his study at Maudoodi Institute in Lahore, Pakistan in 1986 with scholarship from Saudi government. After one year, he quarreled again with one of his lecturers and decided to leave the institution before completing his education in 1987.

Thalib studied the teachings of the Salafi sect from Jamilurrahman al-Salafi al-Afghani in Kunar province, near the Pakistan border around 1990. In 1991–1993 Jafar studied under another Salafi cleric, Muqbil bin Hadi al-Wadi'i in Dammaj, Yemen. He also studied the teachings of the Salafi sect from Nasir al-Albani and ibn Baz.

== Activity ==
Jafar joined the Mujahideen in Afghanistan during its war against the Soviet Union in 1987. He fought and studied for two years under the guidance of Jamilurrahman's Jamaat al Dawa al Quran in Kunar province, near Pakistan border. Jafar met Osama bin Laden in 1987 in Peshawar, at the border between Pakistan and Afghanistan. Although Jafar follows a radical Salafi school of thought, he contradicts himself from Osama Bin Ladin and strongly renounces the violence and terrorism ideology of Osama. He furthermore said that Al-Qaeda is a terrorist organization with Khawarij ideology.

Jafar returned to Indonesia around 1989 and then taught at Al-Irshad Al-Islamiya boarding school in Salatiga run by Osman Yusuf Ba'isa before left for Yemen. Upon his return from Yemen in 1993 with the help of a few Salafi followers, he then set up a boarding school called Ihya Sunnah ("Preserving The Prophet's Tradition") in Degolan village in Sleman, Yogyakarta on the Waqf land endowed by a nephew of some military official at the time.

In 1999, he founded Forum Komunikasi Ahlussunnah Wal Jama’ah (FKAWJ) or Communication Forum of Ahlul Sunnah Wal Jamaah, a group which was meant to push for political reform. Specifically, its purpose was to denounce the campaign of a female presidential candidate, because according to their interpretation sharia law strictly forbids women from having any authority.

He declared the establishment of Laskar Jihad as a paramilitary group of FKAWJ on January 30, 2000, as an effort to defend and protect Moluccan Muslims from violence by Christians in Maluku during Maluku sectarian conflict. The group started a recruitment of members who want to wage jihad in Ambon. Although Jihad was one of the most important principles of the group, it was never meant to be an aggressor to war. It limited the jihad to defensive action to protect Muslims from Christian attacks. It was not also to mitigate a rebellion against the legitimate government.

In response to the September 11 attacks, he said:

"We would like to grieve for the US [but] you should learn from your arrogance. For Muslims, we would like to congratulate you for the revenge upon terrors committed by the biggest terrorist nation in the world, the United States, on Muslim nations"

— Jafar Umar Thalib

In 2001 the police arrested him for allegedly presiding over a makeshift Islamic court that ordered a rapist be stoned to death, which is illegal under Indonesian law. He allegedly led the execution himself, though he was never prosecuted of his act. Later, POLRI accused Jafar of sowing hatred against Christians, particularly in Ambon, where about dozen masked men with guns, grenades and daggers attacked the village of Soya near Ambon, torching about 30 homes and a church and killing at least 12 Christians, on which Jafar denied Laskar Jihad was involved.

Jafar was arrested on May 4, 2002, in Surabaya as he was en route from Ambon. In October 2002, Laskar Jihad was officially disbanded by the staff and board of supervisors of FKAWJ after a marathon meeting from October 3 to October 7, 2002. Jafar Umar Thalib disagreed with the board's decision as he was still in litigation with the East Jakarta District court where he was indicted for acts of treason, inciting, and insulting Indonesian President at that time, Megawati Sukarnoputri. In October 2002, Jafar obliged to announce the dissolution of Laskar Jihad when reporters asked for confirmation moments after the Bali bombings. However, Jafar apparently still tried to gather troops to perform demonstrations so that he could press the District Court to ease his sentence. However it turned out with the dissolution of the Laskar Jihad, he was ultimately acquitted. According to the judge panel, there was no proof that Jafar had insulted or defamed Megawati Sukarnoputri, inciting the masses, and for his call for hostility in his speeches at al-Fatah Mosque in Ambon, April 26, 2002. Later he was freed from all charges on January 30, 2003.

== Wahhabism and Anti-Shiism ==
At the launch of a book entitled Mereka Bukan Thagut (They're Not Cause of Evil), Jafar affirmed his stance that he is a genuine Wahabist.

As common among Salafi Wahhabists to strongly oppose Shia Muslims and even consider them Infidels, Jafar in June 2013 once said that he would declare a jihad against Indonesian Shia Muslims which allegedly tried to intimidate a Sunni congregation in Bekasi.

== Death ==
28 days after his release, Ja'far Umar Thalib admitted to the Harapan Kita National Heart Center Hospital, Jakarta due to cardiovascular issue. He died five days later on Sunday, August 25, 2019, at 12:10 WIB. His body was held at Masjid Al-Fatah, Kampung Melayu. Then left for Yogyakarta by plane. The body was buried the next day in Degolan, Umbulmartani Village, Ngemplak District, Sleman Regency, Yogyakarta. Several figures in Indonesia gave the condolences, including Police General Muhammad Tito Karnavian and General of the TNI (retired) Abdullah Mahmud Hendropriyono.

== See also ==
- Rizieq Shihab
- Jemaah Islamiyah
- Laskar Jihad
