= Kafa'ah =

Term in Islamic jurisprudence

Kafā'ah (Arabic: الكفاءة; al-kafā'ah) is a term used to describe a form of endogamy in the field of Islamic jurisprudence with regard to marriage in Islam, which in Arabic, literally means 'equality' or 'equivalence'.However, it should not be conflated with spousal equality. Rather, it refers to the recommendation that the man's social status is at least equal/equivalent to the woman, or greater.This compatibility is dependent on multiple factors that include religion, social status, morality, piety, wealth, lineage or custom.

== Legal rulings ==
Islamic scholars (ulama) hold differing opinions and arguments on the doctrine of kafa'ah based on the Quran and Hadith. What is consistently agreed upon by the four Sunni schools of law is the compatibility of religion. Muslim women can thus marry only Muslim men, but Muslim men are also permitted to marry Jewish or Christian women. In Shia Islam, there is no concept of kafa'ah on the basis of lineage.

=== Hanafism ===
According to the traditional Hanafi school of thought, kafa'ah represents a special proportionality between a man and a woman in marriage.

=== Malikism ===
The traditional Maliki position states that kafa'ah is the proportionality in religion for both husband and wife.

=== Shafi'ism ===
According to the Shafi'i school of thought, kafa'ah concerns the factors of lineage, religiousness, profession, and being free of defects that permit annulling the marriage contract (nikah). It must not be misunderstood as a recommendation of whom to marry. Rather, it should be taken as a legal restriction to protect a woman's interest in her marriage. If a woman wishes to marry someone who is seemingly incompatible based these factors, there is nothing wrong in her doing so. Accordingly, an Arab woman should not marry a non-Arab man; similarly, a virtuous woman should not marry a corrupt man, (though it is sufficient should the husband give up his wrongdoing). A daughter of someone with a higher profession should not marry a man of a lowly profession. The wealth of either parties is not a factor to be considered, as it is merely temporary and "those with self-respect and intelligence do not take pride in it."

=== Hanbalism ===
Scholars of the Hanbali school of thought state that kafa'ah represents the similarities and proportionality based on five factors, namely, religion, lineage, independence, jobs and wealth.

== Objectives ==
The main goal of kafa'ah is to make a peaceful and lasting marriage. The argument is that a household built based on the common perceptions, equivalent views, and understandings would make a peaceful and happy marriage. However, if such a rationale is to be accepted, it raises the question as to why these restrictions only apply to a prospective wife and not the husband. An objective more congruous with the legal rulings would be to protect the interests of the prospective wife by ensuring that she is not in disgrace in her conjugal bond. This however, raises the question as to why it would be a disgrace for an Arab woman to marry a non-Arab man.

== The Hadhrami controversy ==
=== Social stratification between Sayyids and non-Sayyids ===
The controversies associated with the doctrine of kafa'ah were exemplified in a chain of events which occurred in Hadhramaut, Yemen, in 1905. People of the Ba 'Alawi sada, especially of Hadhrami descent, adhered to a stricter and more rigid system of social stratification based on the kafa'ah of descent. In particular, a Sayyid woman is prohibited from marrying a non-Sayyid man. This extreme position is absent in the canon of orthodox Shāfi'i scholarship, the school to which the Hadramis otherwise adhered. Controversy erupted when a number of marriages between Sayyid women and non-Sayyid men were publicly discovered, which thus became a subject of public condemnation and clamour because of their perceived unsuitability.

=== Dissent by Rashid Rida and Ahmad Surkati ===
In response to the heated controversy, Islamic reformer Rashid Rida argued that such marriages were valid and permissible, in his journal al-Manār in Egypt. There was nothing in Islamic law, as he argued, that prohibited marriages between Sayyid women and non-Sayyid men. Rida's views were echoed by Ahmad Surkati, who wrote a pamphlet in 1915 titled Surah al-Jawāb (The Form of the Answer) in permitting such marriages based on the principle of equality. According to Surkati, kafa'ah should be restricted to the rationale of ensuring a good relationship between the partners; accordingly, if a woman decides to marry someone seemingly inferior, because "of other such qualities which please women", she is allowed to do so.

The traditional Hadhrami interpretation of kafa'ah (in restricting marriage between Sayyid women and non-Sayyid men) is not found in the canon of orthodox Islamic scholarship. The arguments promulgated by Rida and Surkati were defenses of traditional Islamic scholarship and rejections of Hadhrami societal attitudes determined by self-interest.

=== Rebuttal by Sayyid Umar al-Attas ===
These arguments, however, were strongly rebutted by Sayyids, one of whom was Sayyid Umar al-Attas, a leading Hadhrami scholar residing in Singapore, who declared such marriages to be unlawful. In doing so, he identified four levels of compatibility based on descent (which always applies for women and not for men, i.e., a man can marry someone from a lower rank, but a woman cannot): Arabs must not marry non-Arabs, Qurashīs must not marry non-Qurashīs, Hāshimites must not marry non-Hāshimites, and descendants of Hasan and Husayn must not marry anyone other than other Hasanids and Husaynids. In his book published in 1905, The Marriage Between A Sharifah and A Non-Sharif and Esteemed Position of Ahl al-Bayt, he concluded that it is impermissible for a Sayyid woman to marry a non-Sayyid man, even if it is based on her own desires or with the consent of her wali. Additionally, Abdullāh Daḥlān attacked Surkati's stance that all humans were equal, arguing instead that God had created some humans like the Prophet's family as superior to others. The dispute quickly deteriorated into racist diatribes. Daḥlān reportedly remarked about Surkati, "Will the Negro stand corrected of his saying or persist in his stubbornness?" Other Hadhrami Sayyids insulted Surkati by calling him "the black death", "black slave", "the black", "the Sudanese" or "the Negro", all while claiming that he could not speak Arabic and that he was a non-Arab.

=== Consequences ===
The far-reaching consequences of this heated discussion went beyond the doctrine of kafa'ah and sparked a power struggle in Hadhramī communities in South East Asia. People began to openly question the rigid system of social stratification dominated by the Sayyids, their status and privileges. Some of the practices that became publicly contentious include the custom of taqbil (kissing the hands of Sayyids), and the exclusive use of the title, "Sayyid" itself.

== See also ==
- Divorce in Islam
- Marriage in Islam
