= Indonesia–Sudan relations =

- Indonesia: Sudan

Indonesia–Sudan relations was officially established on 10 March 1957 when Mahmud Latjuba was accredited as Envoy Extraordinary and Minister Plenipotentiary of Indonesia to Sudan resident in Cairo. In February 2012, during a visit of Sudanese Foreign Minister Ali Karti to Jakarta, Indonesia and Sudan has agreed to foster bilateral relations in politics, science, education and economic sectors. Indonesia has an embassy in Khartoum which relocated to Port Sudan due to security concerns, while Sudan has an embassy in Jakarta. Both countries have Muslim-majority populations and are members of the Organisation of Islamic Cooperation and Non-Aligned Movement.

== History ==
The historic relations between Indonesia and Sudan began earlier prior to the independence of both nations. In 1910, an ulama from Sudan, Sheikh Ahmad Surkati, came to the Dutch East Indies and established the Al Irsyad foundation which works in Islamic education up until now. In 1955, a Sudanese delegation attended the Asia Africa Conference in Bandung. Although at that time, Sudan was still under British-Egypt rule, Indonesia showed its support by recognizing Sudan as a separate table from Egypt.

In 1960, the diplomatic relations were strengthened with the opening of an Indonesian embassy in Khartoum. However, in 1967, the Indonesian embassy in Khartoum was closed due to financial restraints until it reopened on 6 January 1996.

== Trade and investment ==
Indonesian state oil and gas company Pertamina and private company Medco Energi International are conducting oil exploration in Sudan. Oil is Sudan's main export to Indonesia, while Indonesia exports furniture, car batteries, cement and paper to Sudan. In April 2013, the two nations formed a Joint Technical Committee on Agriculture and Farming. To secure its textile industry and food security, Indonesia has expressed its interest to invest in the agricultural and farming sectors in Sudan, especially in cotton, sugar and rice plantations.
