= Isa Anshary =

Indonesian politician, religious leader, and orator (1916–1969)

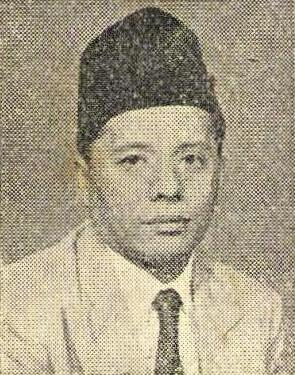
- Official portrait, 1956

Member of the House of Representatives
- In office 16 August 1950 – 24 June 1960
- Constituency: West Java

Personal details
- Born: 1 July 1916; Manindjau, Dutch East Indies (present-day Indonesia)
- Died: 11 December 1969 (aged 53); Bandung, Indonesia
- Political party: Masyumi

Muhammad Isa Anshary (1 July 1916 – 11 December 1969) was an Indonesian politician, religious leader, and orator. A member of the Masyumi Party, he served as a member of the House of Representatives from 1950 to 1960 and was also head of the West Java branch of Masyumi. He was often considered a radical, and was known for his inflammatory rhetoric and anti-communism.

== Early life ==
Muhammad Isa Anshary was born on 1 July 1916 in Manindjau, in what was then the Dutch East Indies (present-day Indonesia). He received an education at a Sekolah Rakjat (lit. 'People's School') as well as a Sekolah Agama (lit. 'Religion School'). He also took courses on foreign languages, politics, economics, and sociology. In 1932, at the age of sixteen, he left for Bandung where he became fascinated with the ideas of Sukarno. This led Isa to abandon his plans of studying in Yogyakarta to pursue a political career.

== Nationalist movement ==
He joined the nationalist Partindo political party by lying about his age. He also became a member of the Bandung branch of the Persatuan Pemuda Rakjat Indonesia (lit. 'Popular Union of Indonesian Youth') which was a radical, revolutionary youth group. In addition to his involvement in Partindo, Isa took part in religion classes organized by the Persatuan Islam (Persis, lit. 'Islamic Union'). Gradually, he became more involved in Islamic politics and took over the leadership of the Sumatra-based Persatuan Muslim Indonesia (Permi, lit. 'Union of Indonesian Muslims') branch in Bandung.

Following the break-up of Partindo in 1934, he restricted his political activities to Islamic organizations. He became a member of Muhammadiyah and later Persis. Around this time, Isa became the secretary of the Bandung branch of the Indonesian Islamic Party with Mohammad Natsir as chairman. He also became the chief editor of two Islamic magazines—Aliran Muda (lit. 'Young Stream') and Lasjkar Islam (lit. 'Islamic Warriors')—and was involved in helping various other Islamic publications, such as the daily Perbintjangan (lit. 'Conversation') in Bandung and weekly Pandji Islam (lit. 'Islamic Banner') in Medan. He also became a member of the secretariat of the Indonesian Political Federation.

== Occupation and revolution ==
In 1942, the Dutch East Indies were invaded by the Empire of Japan. During the subsequent occupation period, Isa worked in the offices of a Japanese propaganda organization—the Center of the People's Power—in Priangan. The Japanese also established the Majelis Islam A'la Indonesia (MIAI) during their occupation and Isa was appointed MIAI secretary for Priangan. However, his involvement with the Angkatan Muda Indonesia (lit. 'Indonesian Youth Force') which advocated for Indonesian independence led to his imprisonment for a month. He had been one of the founders of the organization and was part of its secretariat. Isa also founded and led an illegal "Anti-Fascist Movement" consisting of militant youths and select ulamas. Following the Proclamation of Indonesian Independence in 1945, he became a leader in the Sabilillah in Priangan. During the Indonesian National Revolution, Isa founded the Gerakan Muslimin Indonesia (lit. 'Indonesian Muslims' Movement') which was opposed to the State of Pasundan.

== House of Representatives ==
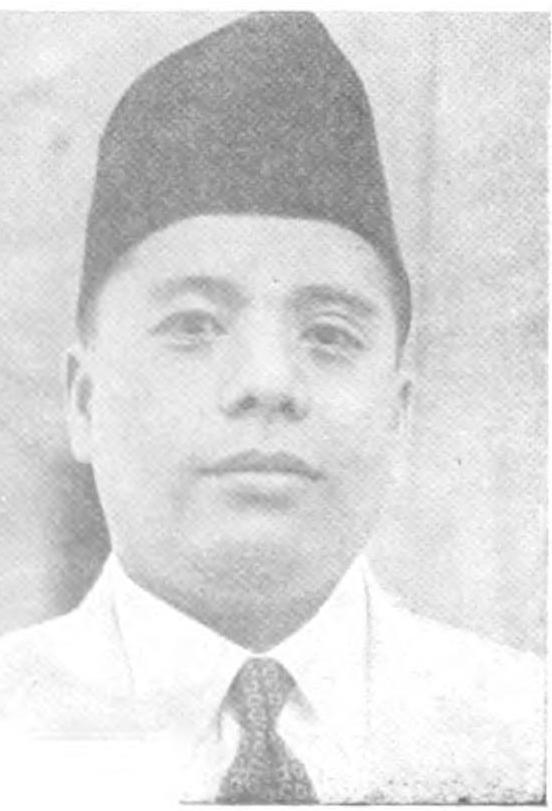
Official portrait, 1954

Following the end of the revolution and the transfer of sovereignty, Isa became head of the West Java branch of the Masyumi Party. He was also appointed into the Provisional House of Representatives and was sworn into office on 16 August 1950. He would be re-elected to the House of Representatives after the 1955 legislative elections, representing the electoral district of West Java. During his time in the House of Representatives, Isa was put under arrest by the Soekiman Cabinet as part of mass arrests of leftists in 1951, despite being an anti-communist. He also joined in criticism of Indonesian Army policies in 1952, eventually leading to the 17 October affair.

In 1953, President Sukarno gave a speech in South Kalimantan where he opposed the establishment of an Islamic state in Indonesia. Isa disapproved of the speech, and declared that Sukarno's words were both "undemocratic" and "unconstitutional." The Indonesian National Party came to Sukarno's defense, and attacked Isa as a "fanatic" and an "unscrupulous agitator," with Ki Sarmidi Mangunsarkoro calling him a "friend of the Darul Islam."

Isa was considered a radical, and was hostile to the secular nationalist movement. French historian Rémy Madinier wrote that Isa was "emblematic of the most intransigent tendency within the party," and that "he was well-versed in vilifying the impious (kafirs) and the unfaithful (munafiks) who, he said, claimed to love Islam but in fact acted contrary to its laws." Meanwhile, Australian scholar Herbert Feith wrote that Isa was an "important political figure of radical fundamentalist conviction." He was also a fervent anti-communist and was affectionately dubbed "Masyumi's McCarthy" by Mohammad Natsir.

== Later life and death ==
On 24 June 1960, President Sukarno dissolved the House of Representatives after it rejected the government budget. A new body, the House of Representatives of Mutual Assistance, was then formed but no members of the Masyumi took part in it. The party was banned that same year and its leaders were arrested by the government. Isa himself was arrested in 1962 and held in Madiun.

Isa died in Bandung on 11 December 1969.
