= Haidar Bagir =

Indonesian entrepreneur, philanthropist, author and lecturer

- حيدر
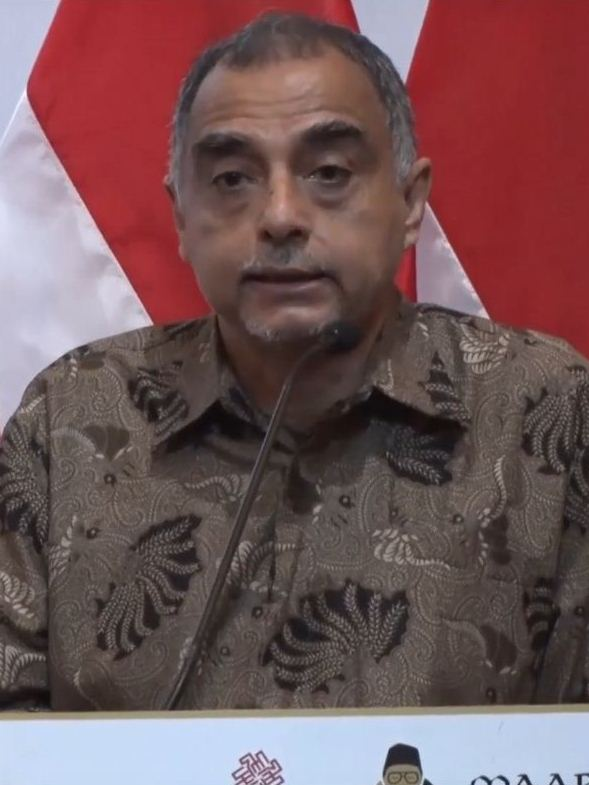
- Bagir in 2019
- Born: Haidar
- Citizenship: Indonesia
- Education: Bandung Institute of Technology; Harvard University; University of Indonesia
- Occupations: Islamic scholar, Philanthropist, Businessman
- Organization: Mizan Group
- Known for: Co-founder and CEO of Mizan Publishing Company
- Notable work: Mizan; Lazuardi Schools
- Title: Dr.
- Spouse: Lubna binti Abdullah bin Segaf Assegaf
- Children: Muhammad Irfan, Mustafa Kamil, Ali Riza, Syarifa Rahima
- Parent(s): Muhammad Bagir al-Habshi (father); Gamar binti Toha bin Abdullah Assegaf (mother)

Haidar Bagir is an Indonesian entrepreneur, philanthropist, author, lecturer, and the president director of the Mizan Group. His latest book is Islam: The Faith of Love and Happiness published by Kube Publishing.

== Education ==
He got his undergraduate degree from the Department of Industrial Engineering, Bandung Institute of Technology. He finished his course works at the Graduate Program of the State Institute of Islamic Thought, Jakarta, but received his master's degree from the Center for Middle Eastern Studies at Harvard University, and his doctoral degree from the Department of Humanities, University of Indonesia (with one-year research in the Department of History and Philosophy of Science at Indiana University, Bloomington) with dissertation entitled Mystical Experience in the Epistemology of Mulla Shadra and its Comparison with Heidegger’s Idea about Thinking (Denken).

== Career ==
He has been the president director of Mizan Group, which he founded in 1982. Mizan is ranked among the biggest publishing houses in Indonesia. It has also won several awards for its movie productions such as Laskar Pelangi, Garuda di Dadaku, 3 Hati 2 Dunia 1 Cinta.

Bagir teaches at the Islamic College for Advanced Studies (ICAS)/ Sadra Institute in Jakarta, is the chairman of the Lazuardi Hayati Foundation for Education (an umbrella organization of a network of pre-K to K-12 schools in several cities in Indonesia), Founder of YASMIN (a foundation for philanthropic works on community education and health in Jakarta), and chairman of IIMaN Center for the Development of Positive Sufism. He is also the editor-in-chief of Kanz Philosophia, a journal for Islamic Philosophy and Mysticism

Bagir has been a recipient of several grants from U.S. institutions, including a Fulbright Grant for Graduate Studies at the Center for Middle Eastern Studies, Harvard University, a Fulbright Grant for Doctoral Research in the Department of History and Philosophy of Science at Indiana University, and the CTNS Award for Religion and Science Curriculum Development. He has taught Islam in the University of Sciences in Philadelphia as a visiting scholar within Fulbright's Direct Access to the Muslim World program and was appointed as the Misher Professor of Humanities 2005 by the university.

With some prominent Indonesian figures such as Professor Komaruddin Hidayat, Professor Franz Magnis Suseno, Dr. Seto Mulyadi, and Abdillah Toha, he declared a movement called Gerakan Islam Cinta (Loving-Islam Movement), which to remind Indonesian Muslims (and the world) that Islam is not merely about rules and laws, but also about loving others. In the declaration Bagir quoted his professor at Harvard University, Annemarie Schimmel, that Islam has been misunderstood as a religion of law, even as religion of violence and war; that many orientalists and historians and even Muslims themselves tend to forget the loving aspects of Islam.

Bagir's name has also been included in the list of the 500 Most Influential Muslims in the World, in all editions from 2009 to 2015, issued by the Prince Alwaleed Bin Talal Center for Muslim-Christian Understanding at Georgetown University and the Royal Islamic Strategic Studies Center in Amman, Jordan.

Bagir was one of the winners of 2018 Global Business & Peace Awards held in Seoul for his contributions in interfaith understanding and peace in Indonesia.

== Bibliography ==
He has written numerous papers and articles on various topics – especially in the fields of Islamic philosophy, mysticism, and thought – published in national newspapers, magazines, and journals as well as in several books and seminar proceedings and authored eight books, including Speaking the Unspeakable. Mystical Experience According to Mulla Sadra (to be published soon), Deciphering Mystical Experience: A Comparison between Mulla Sadra and Heidegger (2007, limited edition), Pocket Book of Islamic Philosophy, Pocket Book of Tasawuf (Islamic mysticism), Islamic Political Philosophy Between Alfarabi and Ayatullah Khomeini, The New Era of Ethical Management, Islam, Risalah Cinta dan Kebahagiaan (Islam, a Message of Love and Happiness), and co-authored Revelation of Secrets: A Sufi Hermeneutics (to be published soon). His writings can be found on the website http://haidarbagir.com/

== Memberships ==
- Haidar Bagir is currently the regional coordinator of International Society for Islamic Philosophy for Indonesia, Australia and New Zealand. He is also a member of the Global Compassionate Council , as well being one of the advisers to the London-based Islamic Human Rights Commission. Bagir is also on the advisory board of the Indonesian chapter of Globethics.net, a global network of persons and institutions interested in various fields of applied ethics.
