= Novel Baswedan =

Indonesian policeman and anti-corruption specialist

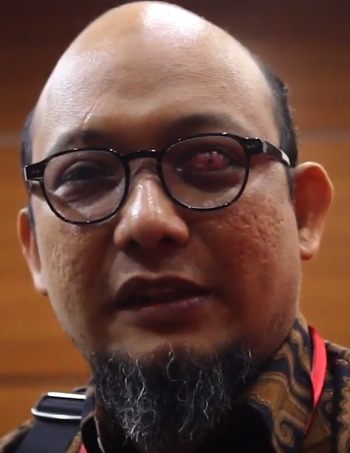
- Baswedan in 2018, after the acid attack
- Born: 22 June 1977 (age 48); Semarang, Central Java, Indonesia
- Organization(s): Corruption Eradication Commission (2007–2021) (Note: Initially assigned to KPK as part of police duties, but later left the police force and fully joined KPK); Indonesian Police (1998–2014)
- Family: Abdurrahman Baswedan (grandfather); Anies Baswedan (cousin)
- Police career
- Department: Indonesian National Police
- Service years: 1998–2014
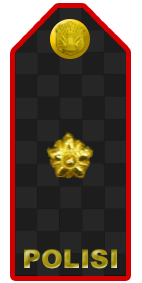
- Rank: Police Commissioner

Novel Baswedan (Arabic: نوڤيل باسويدان, born 22 June 1977) is an Indonesian investigator previously working for the Corruption Eradication Commission (KPK) and a former officer of the Indonesian Police (Polri).

Baswedan underwent police education and joined the police force in 1998, where he served in Bengkulu. In 2005, he left the organization and later joined KPK as an investigator. Baswedan was involved in several high-profile cases and was arrested by the Indonesian Police for some time. He was assaulted in 2017 through acid throwing, in a case that drew major national attention.

== Early life and education ==
Baswedan was born in Semarang, Central Java, on 22 June 1977. During his early education, his family's economic situation necessitated him to work as a construction worker while studying in junior high school, though he had reportedly desired to become a police officer from his youth. After graduating from highschool in Semarang, he initially intended to enroll at a university in Surakarta, but cancelled it due to financial reasons and he instead joined the Police Academy. He graduated from the academy, and joined the police force, in 1998.

== Career ==
=== Police officer ===
After his graduation, Baswedan was assigned to Bengkulu, where he was involved in a number of cases including a forestry and an illegal gambling case. In 2004, he was promoted to head of the provincial police's criminal investigation agency. Four days after his promotion, an incident occurred where police officers under his command abused suspects in a theft case - Baswedan was investigated for ethical violations and later received a reprimand, though he remained in his office until October 2005. He was then reassigned to the criminal investigation agency for the central police headquarters.

=== KPK ===
In 2007, Polri's headquarters assigned Baswedan to the Corruption Eradication Commission (KPK). At KPK, Baswedan handled several high-profile cases, including the arrest of Muhammad Nazaruddin for graft related to the 2011 Southeast Asian Games, a bribery case during the election of a deputy governor for Bank Indonesia, bribery of Constitutional Court chief justice Akil Mochtar, and others.

Following a KPK investigation of alleged corruption within the police, which named a police general as suspect, Baswedan was investigated by the police in retaliation. On 5 October 2012, police officers (from Bengkulu) went to the KPK building in order to arrest Baswedan, accusing him of having conducted violence during interrogation procedures in the 2004 theft case. Within hours of the initial attempt, civilian activists formed a human chain around the KPK building in order to prevent police from arresting Baswedan, launched a social media campaign, and held demonstrations which successfully pressured President Susilo Bambang Yudhoyono to order the ceasing of Baswedan's investigation by the police and allow the police general to be prosecuted by KPK. Baswedan eventually submitted an early retirement from the police force in 2014.

Despite the initial halting, the police announced that Baswedan's investigation had been resumed in February 2015. Novel did not respond to two summons that month (from which KPK's acting president had prohibited Baswedan from complying with) and he was arrested in his home on 1 May 2015. He was briefly detained, but he was released shortly afterwards and by 3 May he was giving interviews criticizing the police's actions, referring to them as a form of revenge. The Indonesian Ombudsman later published a recommendation which named maladministrative practices by the police during Baswedan's investigation, which included falsification of documents and deviation from procedure.

=== 2017 attack and aftermath ===
On 11 April 2017, Baswedan was walking home from morning prayers at his local mosque in North Jakarta when two men threw acid at his face. The attack took place during a high-profile investigation into corruption in the Electronic Identity Card (e-KTP) project, which involved Speaker of the People's Representative Council Setya Novanto and other senior politicians. The attack left him blinded in one eye, and he underwent treatment in Singapore.

After around three months of police investigations yielded no results, National Police Chief Tito Karnavian agreed to form a joint investigative team with KPK, following a meeting with President Joko Widodo. Baswedan returned from medical treatment in February 2018, and by July 2018 he had returned to his job as head of the investigation task force. Baswedan later said police were "not really serious in handling [his] case". After over two years of investigation, Widodo on 1 November 2019 gave a one-month deadline to newly appointed police chief Idham Azis to solve the Baswedan case. In late December that year, two active police officers, Rahmat Kadir Mahulette and Ronny Bugis, were arrested under suspicion of launching the assault. Baswedan said the two officers were scapegoats acting under orders from their superiors. At a court session on 11 June 2020, a state prosecutor recommended a one-year prison term for both suspects, The demand was widely condemned as being too lenient. On the night of 14 July 2020, North Jakarta District Court sentenced Mahulette to two years, while Bugis was jailed for 18 months.

In June 2021, Baswedan was among 75 KPK employees who failed the National Insight Test (Tes Wawasan Kebangsaan or TWK), a civic knowledge test that became a requirement for KPK employees to transfer their status to Civil Servants (ASN). The policy proved controversial, with critics viewing it as an attempt to purge experienced anti-corruption investigators.

In response to the controversy, Baswedan and other affected employees filed a complaint with the National Human Rights Commission (Komnas HAM), alleging human rights violations in the testing process.

On 30 September 2021, Baswedan was officially dismissed from KPK.

== Family ==
Baswedan is the grandson of journalist and politician Abdurrahman Baswedan, and is the first cousin of 17th Jakarta Governor Anies Baswedan. He is married to Rina Emilda, and the couple has five children.
