= Ahmad Surkati =

Founder of Arab Association for Reform and Guidance

Sheikh Ahmad Surkati
- أحمد السركتي
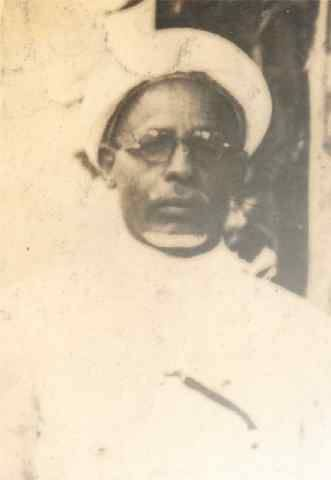
- Sheikh Ahmad Surkati
- Born: 1875 CE; Udfu, Dongola, Ottoman Egyptian Sudan (now Sudan)
- Died: 6 September 1943 (aged 67–68); Djakarta, Japanese-occupied East Indies (now Indonesia)
- Education: Ma'had Syarqi Na (Sudan), Darul 'Ulum (Mecca)
- Occupations: Islamic scholar, teacher
- Years active: 1909–1941
- Organization: al-Irshad
- Known for: Founder of al-Irshad
- Title: Sheikh
- Parent: Muhammad al-Surkati (father)

Ahmad Surkati (Arabic: احمد بن محمد السركتي; Aḥmad bin Muḥammad as-Surkatī; Arabic pronunciation: [(ʔ)æħmæd bin mʊˈħæmmæd ælsurkɑtij]; 1875 CE – 6 September 1943) was the founder of the organization Jam'iyat al-Islah wa Al-Irsyad al-Arabiyah (Arab Association for Reform and Guidance), which later transformed into Jam'iyat al-Islah wal Irsyad al-Islamiyyah, which is more commonly called as al-Irshad in Batavia, August 1915. Many historians acknowledge al-Irshad role in the reformation of Islamic thought in Indonesia, but unfortunately his name is not mentioned in the discourse of Islamic thought in Indonesia.

== Early life ==
Ahmad Surkati was born Ahmad bin Muhammad Surkati al-Anshori in around 1875 CE in Udfu, Arqu island near Dongola town, Sudan. The word Surkati is taken from Dongolawi language meaning Many Books (Sur, books; Katti, many), because His grandfather had a lot of books when he returned from study. It is believed that he was descendant of a Sahabah named Jabir bin Abdillah al-Anshori.

He came from an educated family; both his father and grandfather had studied in Egypt, with his father graduated from Al-Azhar University in Cairo. Surkati received his earliest education from his father and succeeded in memorizing the text of al-Quran at a young age. Ahmad attended Ma'had Syarqi Na, an institute led by a distinguished scholar in Dongola. After completing his study at the Institute, his father wanted him to pursue education at Al-Azhar in Egypt as he had done. But the intention was never fulfilled because Sudan was then ruled by the reign of al-Mahdi which was trying to escape from Egyptian ruling. The King of Sudan at the time, Abdullah al-Taaisha, did not allow the people of Sudan to travel to Egypt.

After completing his basic Islamic education in Sudan, He traveled to Mecca to carry out hajj in 1896 CE. Ahmad only briefly stayed in Mecca, then he moved on to Medina and later returned to Mecca. In Medina, He deepened his religious studies and Arabic literature for approximately four and a half years. Two of his famous teachers in Medina were two members of the original Moroccan muhaddiths, namely Sheikh Salih and Umar Hamdan. He also learned the Qur'an from Sheikh Muhammad al-Khuyari. He studied fiqh knowledge from two fiqh scholars at the time, Sheikh Ahmad Mahjub and Sheikh Mubarak an-Nismat (he mostly studied Shafi'i Madhhab), where for the Arabic studies, he learned it from a linguist named Sheikh Muhammad al-Barzan.

He lived in Hejaz for fifteen years in which more than eleven years he spent it in Mecca, where he received "mainstream" education with an emphasis on Hadith, where He graduated from Darul 'Ulum in Mecca. Ahmad Surkati was the first Sudanese to earn the title of al-Allamah in 1326 AH. His outstanding skills as a scholar began to be noticed in around 1909 when he was awarded a distinguished teaching post in Mecca, a position he retained before He was invited by Jamiat Kheir and moved to Batavia.

== Career ==
=== At Jamiat Kheir ===
Due to lack of qualified teachers to teach at the Jamiat Kheir school, the board decided to hire teachers from overseas. In around October 1911, Ahmad Surkati arrived in Batavia along with two other teachers, a Sudanese Muhammad bin Abdul Hamid and Muhammad al-Tayyib, a Moroccan who soon returned to his homeland. They had been preceded by another teacher, the Tunisian Muhammad bin Uthman al-Hashimi who had come to the Indies in 1910. Surkati was appointed inspector at the Jamiat Kheir schools. His first two years at this position was a great success, creating an assurance for the Jamiat Kheir to hire four more foreign teachers in October 1913.

Some of more conservative Sayyid members of the Jamiat Kheir were becoming increasingly concerned about Surkati's influence on the Hadhrami community, and particular his attitudes towards the Sayyids themselves. A situation arose regarding the permissibility of non-sayyid men marrying a sayyid woman in Solo in 1913 during the school holidays when Sukarti was staying there and was consulted about the case. A non-Muslim Chinese had a concubine who was a Sayyid's daughter, ostensibly the woman was with him because of her poverty. Surkati regarded her situation as disgraceful so proposed that the Hadramis in the area donate money to her or that she be married by a non-Sayyid Muslim. His first suggestion was ignored and the second suggestion was denounced as forbidden by the Sayyid community (a non-Sayyid man did not match the Kafa'ah for a Sayyid woman). Surkati argued the marriage of non-Sayyid man to a Sayyid woman would be permitted according to the Islamic Law. Surkati gave his answer in more detail with arguments in column Surat al-Jawaab in newspaper "Suluh Hindia" whose editor in chief was Haji Oemar Said Tjokroaminoto. His opinion was quickly heard by the Jamiat Kheir leaders in Batavia, and his relationship with the more conservative Sayyids began to deteriorate rapidly. Sukarti also experienced racist criticism against him over this conflict. The name "'Alawi-Irshadi conflict" became applied to the split between the Sayyid faction (known as 'Alawis, Alawīyūn) and the non-Sayyids (al-Irshād led by Surkati). The 'Alawi Sayyid Muhammad bin 'Abdullāh al-'Aṭṭās even said "The al-Irshad organization, in my view, is no pure Arab organization. There is too much African blood among its members for that". 'Abdullāh Daḥlān attacked Surkati's stance that all humans whether Sayyid or non-Sayyid were equal by arguing that God creating some humans like the Prophet's family (the Sayyids) as superior to others. He said, "will the Negro return from his error or persist in his stubbornness?" Some Hadrami Sayyids including Daḥlān resorted to extreme racist results and insulted Sukarti, calling him "the black death", "black slave", "the black", "the Sudanese" and "the Negro", all while claiming that Sukarti could not speak Arabic and was a non-Arab.

Surkati then wrote his arguments and answers in Al-Masa `il ats-Tsalats in 1925 which contained the issue of Ijtihad, Bid‘ah, Sunnah, Heresy, Ziyarat (visiting graves), Taqbil (kissing the hands of Sayyids) and Tawassul. This essay paper actually was prepared as the material for a debate with Ali al-Thayyib of the Ba'alawi. The debate itself was initially planned to be held in Bandung. But Ali al-Thayyib cancelled it and asked the debate to be held in Masjid Ampel in Surabaya. But eventually he cancelled it again so there was no debate at all. Surkati tendered his resignation from his position on September 18, 1914.

=== Al-Irshad ===
Many non-Sayyids and some Sayyids left the Jamiat Kheir with him. He initially intended to return to Mecca where he used to teach, but was persuaded to stay by a few non-Sayyid Hadhramis named Umar manqūsh (or Mangus with another transliteration) the Kapitein der Arabieren in Batavia, Sholih ‘Ubaid and Sa’id bin Salim al-Mash’abi, so he then opened another Islamic school named Al-Irshad Al-Islamiya in Batavia on September 6, 1914, with the financial assistance of some Arabs, the largest of which of Abdullah bin Alwi Alatas as 60,000 Dutch gulden. The legal recognition by Dutch colonial government was issued on August 11, 1915.

After three years of existence, the Al-Irshad Association began to open schools and branches in cities around Java. Each branch was characterized by the establishment of school (Madrasa). The first branch was in Tegal in 1917, where its Madrasa led by Ahmad Surkati's first generation student, namely Abdullah bin Salim al-Attas. This was followed by the branches in Pekalongan, Cirebon, Bumiayu, Surabaya and other cities.

Al-Irshad in the early days of his birth was known as the Islamic reform group in Nusantara, along with Muhammadiyah and PERSIS (Persatuan Islam). The three main leading characters of this organizations: Ahmad Surkati, Ahmad Dahlan, and Ahmad Hassan (A. Hassan), often referred to as "The Trio of Indonesian Islamic Reformers." All three of them were also close friends. According to A. Hassan, Ahmad Dahlan and himself were in fact disciples of Ahmad Surkati, although with unbound official timetable.

== Later life and death ==
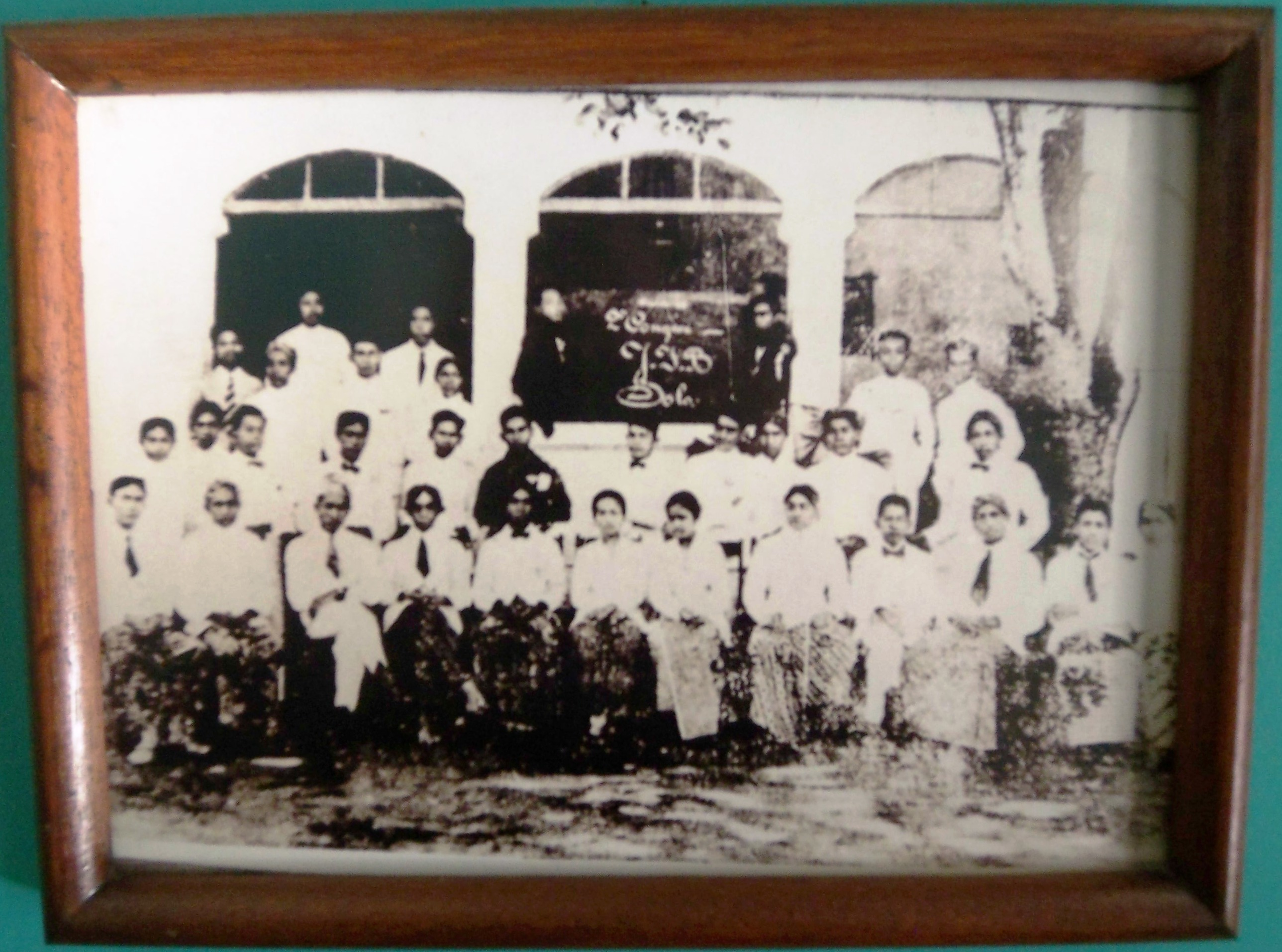
Jong Islamieten Bond (Young Muslim Union) delegates in Youth Pledge. Batavia, 1928

A. Hassan introduced Surkati to Sukarno when he was in exile in Ende, East Nusa Tenggara through Surkati's papers and books. After Sukarno was freed, he often visited Surkati. Ahmad Surkati was also the spiritual teacher of Jong Islamieten Bond (JIB), where its activists such as Muhammad Natsir, Kasman Sigodimedjo and others often learned from.

Ahmad Surkati died at 10:00 am on Thursday, September 6, 1943, at his residence on Gang Solan St. (now Jl. KH. Hasyim Ash'ari no. 25) Jakarta, exactly 29 years after he founded Al-Irshad. His was buried at the Karet Bivak cemetery with modest means, with no gravestone nor sign of anything on the grave to fulfill his last wish before death.

== See also ==
- Satti Majid
- Indonesia–Sudan relations
- Jamiat Kheir
- Muhammadiyah

== Bibliography ==
- Affandi, Bisri (March 1976). "Shaikh Ahmad al-Surkati: His Role in al-Irshad Movement in Java in The Early Twentieth Century" (thesis). Institute of Islamic Studies: McGill University.
- Hasan, Noorhaidi (2006). Laskar Jihad (illustrated ed.). SEAP Publications. ISBN 978-08772-77408.
- Federspiel, Howard M. (2006). Indonesian Muslim Intellectuals of the 20th Century. Institute of Southeast Asian Studies. ISBN 978-98123-02991.
