= Laskar Jihad =

Indonesian paramilitary group

- Logo of Laskar Jihad
- Leader: Jafar Umar Thalib
- Dates active: 2000–2002
- Active regions: Indonesia
- Ideology: Islamism; Islamic fundamentalism Anti-Christian sentiment
- Size: Estimated 3000 members (2002)

Laskar Jihad (lit. 'Warriors of Jihad') was an Islamist and anti-Christian Indonesian militia, which was founded and led by Jafar Umar Thalib. The militia gained notoriety for its role in the Maluku sectarian conflict. The militia disbanded itself in 2002.

== History ==
Laskar Jihad was founded in 2000 by Thalib, an Indonesian who had been trained in Pakistani madrasahs and who had fought together with the mujahadeen in Afghanistan. The primary cause for the creation of Laskar Jihad was the outbreak of sectarian violence in the Indonesian provinces of Maluku and North Maluku where clashes between Muslims and Christians erupted in 1999. Soon after its creation, Laskar Jihad opened recruitment centers in various parts of Indonesia. Muslims joining the militia came from Java, Sumatra, South Sulawesi and Kalimantan. Many of them were unemployed, while some were university students.

Laskar Jihad arrived in Ambon in May 2000 and then in other of the Maluku Islands (also known as the Moluccas) where the Islamist militia joined Maluku Muslims in the fighting with Christian groups, thereby exacerbating the ongoing violence. The intervention of Laskar Jihad soon gave Muslims the upper hand in the conflict, with the Islamists burning down churches and houses of the indigenous Melanesian communities in Ambon and other Moluccan islands. In the following two years, an estimated 9,000 people were killed and hundreds of thousands had to flee their towns. Forced conversions and forced circumcisions of Christians took place in Maluku, while, according to witness accounts, present duty military and police personnel did not interfere. A Laskar Jihad member later recalled being welcomed by Indonesian soldiers who supplied the Islamist militia with standard military equipment.

Additionally, attacks were launched against Christian communities in Sulawesi. Laskar Jihad also sent militants to West Papua and Aceh, at opposite ends of the country.

In February 2002, the Malino II Accord between Muslims and Christians was signed, which demanded among other things the withdrawal of Laskar Jihad from the Maluku Islands. The militia, however, refused to oblige and continued activities in the region under the pretext of "humanitarian work". Eventually, the peace agreement was followed by a decrease in violence in Maluku, though incidents continued through mid- and late 2002.

After the Bali bombings in October 2002, Laskar Jihad announced its alleged disbandment, but soon made a new appearance when it established an office in Sorong in the province of West Papua. Laskar Jihad has also been held responsible for attacks on Papuans. In May 2003, reports smuggled out of Papua claimed arson and machetes had been used to destroy ten townships, their food gardens and livestock, sending the surviving women and children into the jungle to hide from their pursuers.

Laskar Jihad's operations in Maluku and West Papua have been actively supported by parts of the Indonesian military. Much of the funding for the militia has come from within the military. Laskar Jihad fighters have been trained by the Indonesian military elite force Kopassus in a training camp near Bogor in West Java. Laskar Jihad members even received military escorts while travelling from West Java to Surabaya. The behaviour of the military in Maluku was similarly biased. Although at first a newly created military unit, the Joint Battalion, took action against Laskar Jihad in Maluku, it was replaced in mid-2001 by Kopassus, which was more sympathetic towards the militia.

Like the extremist Islamic Defenders Front, Laskar Jihad has also carried out attacks on bars, brothels and discothèques, which were perceived to be un-Islamic.

As of 2002, Laskar Jihad is believed to have disbanded, although several scholars warn that the threat of a resurrection of the militia "still bubbles just below the surface in Indonesia."

== Ideology ==
Laskar Jihad leader Jafar Umar Thalib has voiced public support for the establishment of an Islamic theocracy in Indonesia. Members of his group have called for the introduction of the Sharia. They also resented the 2001 appointment of Megawati Sukarnoputri as President of Indonesia, stating that the appointment of a female president was a sin. In Laskar Jihad camps, women are required to wear burqas, and television is banned.

Thalib has met with Osama bin Laden, but allegedly turned down offers of funding support because of doubts about bin Laden's piety. However, other members of his militia have accepted al-Qaeda support. Thalib, when asked by Jessica Stern whether he promotes Wahhabism in Indonesia, tried to distance himself from Wahhabism, stating that its literature would rely too heavily on weak hadith "that may not be the word of Allah". However, scholars have noted that fatwas issued by Salafi muftis from the Arab Peninsula played a significant role in the formation of Laskar Jihad. It has also been argued that Thalib's efforts to distance himself from al-Qaeda and anything related to it were made in the context of the September 11 terror attacks, when the Indonesian government exerted strong pressure on Laskar Jihad not to exploit anti-American sentiment.

For its violent campaign in Maluku, Laskar Jihad put forward two reasons: first, the defence of fellow Muslims; and second, the fight against separatism. To justify the latter cause, Laskar Jihad even alleged a Zionist-Christian conspiracy trying to undermine the national unity of Indonesia.
