= Taqbil =

Arabic tradition of kissing one's hands or feet

Taqbil or Taqbeel (Arabic: تقبيل; taqbiyl; Arabic pronunciation: [tɑqbi:l]) is the tradition of kissing the hands or feet of one's husband, parent or of religious scholars, although practicing it towards scholars has remained controversial.

== Description ==
Taqbil in Arabic literally means "kissing", and has been a historically common and widespread practice in the Islamic world.

Historically, the gesture is often received by Sayyids of respect from the rest of population, as well as each other, especially domestic family. The gesture may be included as a form of greeting, in which their hand (usually right hand) is kissed.

Hand-kissing may be performed even when the recipient is still a child or a person without any special distinction in terms of religious knowledge or piety, often in recognition of the nobility of one's bloodline rather than the merits of the particular individual. This tradition of Taqbil was also called Shamma as a pejorative, which means "sniffing" in Arabic, as men kissing each other's hand is deemed reprehensible in some schools of Islamic law.

=== In Yemen ===
The practice has been particularly widespread among the Hadhrami people of Yemen, especially towards their Sayyid families.

In the nineteenth and twentieth centuries, some members of the Yemeni Sayyid families continued to put forth justifications for their special treatment, although the practice has been largely discredited by then. One of the prominent jurisprudents at the time, Abdurrahman bin Muhammad al-Mashhur addressed the matter of the special status of the Sayyids in Yemen. He asserted that "the descendants of the Prophet were the most favored of people, and the descendants of 'Alawi the most favored of them all" because of religious learning and practice, their high moral standing, their blessedness and their piety. In response to a question as to the correctness of the practice of kissing the hands of Sayyids, he asserted that it was permissible according to religious authorities.

The tradition currently is no longer common in Yemen, except when a person greets a respected Sayyid out of paying respect to his knowledge-ability or piety, such as to a Shaykh.
