= Al-Irshad Al-Islamiya =

Indonesian religious and educational organization

Al-Irshad
- جمعية الإصلاح والإرشاد الإسلاميه
- al-Irshad logo

- Zone of influence
- Formation: September 6, 1914
- Founder: Shaykh Ahmad Surkati; Umar Mangush; Sa'id bin Salim Mash'abi; Saleh 'Ubayd 'Abdat; Salim bin 'Iwad Balwa'al
- Type: Foundation
- Purpose: Religious islamic; Education
- Headquarters: Jakarta, Indonesia
- Location: Kalibata
- Coordinates: 6.260098°S 106.838823°E
- Region served: Indonesia
- Chairman: Dr. Faisol bin Madi, M.A.
- Website: www.alirsyad.or.id

Al-Irshad Al-Islamiya Association (Arabic: جمعية الإصلاح والإرشاد الإسلاميه, romanized: Jam'iyat al-Ishlah wal Irshad al-Islamiyya) is an organization in Indonesia engaged in educational and religious activities. The organization was established on September 6, 1914 (15 Shawwal 1332 H). The date refers to the establishment of the first Al-Irshad school in Batavia. The organization had its own legal recognition from the Dutch colonial government on August 11, 1915.

== History ==
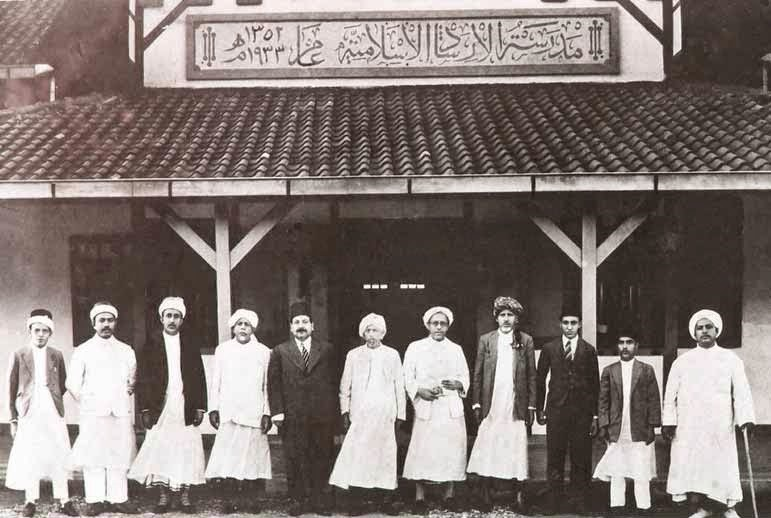
Founders of Al-Irshad in Surabaya, 1935

According to Majlis Da'wah al-Irshad (al-Irshad Department of Preaching), the name Irshad referred to the name (Arabic: جمعية الدعوة والإرشاد, romanized: Jam'iyat al-Da'wah wa al-Irshad; the Association for Propaganda and Guidance) of the founder Rashid Rida who was from Egypt.

Al-Irshad Al-Islamiya is an Indonesian national Islamic organization. In terms of membership, as stated in the Articles of Association of Al-Irshad: "Citizens of the Republic of Indonesia who are Muslims who have grown up." The central figure of the establishment of Al-Irshad is Sheikh Ahmad as-Soorkati al-Ansari, a Sudanese scholar living in Mecca who came to Indonesia at the request of the Jamiat Kheir organization to become a teacher.

The founders are as follows:

- Shaykh Ahmad Surkati
- Umar Mangush
- Sa'id bin Salim Mash'abi
- Salih 'Ubayd 'Abdat
- Salim bin 'Iwad Balwa'al

In its first period of development, the Irshadi movement was under the chairmanship of Salim bin 'Iwad Balwa'al and its administrative included Sheikh Muhammad 'Ubayd 'Abbud as secretary and Sa'id bin Salim Mash'abi as treasurer. All the founders but Ahmad Surkati were rich merchants and businessmen in Jakarta.

Soon after the foundation of Irshadi movement Surkati handed over his school to this movement and became the principal of al-Irshad school. He was joined by one of the scholars of Hadramaut in Indonesia, Sheikh Muhammad 'Ubayd 'Abbud, and all his friends from abroad. In 1913 the Irshadi movement established the following schools:

1. A three-year primary school (Awwaliyah)
2. A four-year elementary school (Ibtida'iyah)
3. A two-year secondary school (tajhiziyah)
4. A four-year school of teachers (mu'allimin)

Among the native Muslims supporting the effort were Haji Ahmad Dahlan and Haji Zamzam. Ahmad Dahlan was the member of Jamiat Kheir who then founded Muhammadiyah in 1912 and Haji Zamzam later built PERSIS (Organization) in 1923. This trio organizations basically have the similar spirits and efforts.

In the early days of the schools, most taught subjects were mostly related to Islamic sciences and Arabic language. The first Irshadi school of Jakarta had eleven teachers from abroad and only one Indonesian teacher (who teaches Indonesian language).

In 1917 two branches were open outside Jakarta, one in Surabaya and another one in Tegal. The branch in Surabaya was run by Abu al-Fadl al-Ansari (Surkati's brother). This school hired two Egyptia teachers, Muhammad Murshidi and 'Abd al-Qadir al-Muhanna. In 1922 'Abd al-Qadir al-Muhanna was replaced by 'Umar b. Salim Hubays. The branch school of al-Irshad in Tegal was opened and run by a student of Surkati, 'Abd Allah b. Salim al-Attas together with Shaykh Muhammad Nuh al-Ansari and another graduate of al-Irshad Jakarta, 'Ali Harharah. Shaykh AbÜ al-Fagl was also one of its teachers.

== Organization ==
The Al-Irsyad movement is founded upon principles known as Mabadi Al-Irsyad:

1. Sources of Law: Understanding the teachings of Islam from the Qur’an and the Sunnah, and referring to both as ultimate authorities.
2. Aqidah/Tawhid: Believing in the Islamic creed based on authentic texts of the Qur’an and Sunnah, especially affirming the oneness of Allah, free from shirk (polytheism), superstition, and heresy.
3. Worship (‘Ibadah): Performing acts of worship in accordance with the guidance of the Qur’an and the Sunnah of the Prophet, purified from religious innovations (bid‘ah).
4. Morality (Akhlaq): Upholding noble manners, Islamic morals, and ethics, while avoiding customs, morals, and ethics that contradict Islam.
5. Equality (Al-Musawah): It is obligatory to regard all Muslims as brothers, not elevating one over another except on the basis of knowledge and piety.
6. Knowledge: Expanding and deepening knowledge for both worldly and spiritual well-being, in a manner that is pleasing to Allah, the Exalted.
7. Modernity: Enhancing personal and social life as well as worldly knowledge, so long as it is not prohibited by explicit Islamic texts; making use of beneficial tools, technical methods, organizational systems, and modern administration for the welfare of individuals, the community, morality, and spirituality.
8. Islamic Brotherhood (Ukhuwah Islamiyyah): Acting and striving skillfully and dynamically with good organization and coordination, in cooperation with other organizations, in the spirit of Islamic brotherhood, solidarity, and mutual support to uphold Islamic ideals, including truth, freedom, justice, virtue, and excellence, all in pursuit of Allah’s pleasure.

== Organization ==
The Organizational Structure of Al-Irsyad Al-Islamiyyah is arranged as follows:

Central Leadership of Al-Irsyad Al-Islamiyyah

The Central Leadership manages the organization at the national level. Its leadership structure consists of:

- Council (Majelis) of Education and Teaching
- Council (Majelis) of Da‘wah (Religious Outreach)
- Council (Majelis) of Social and Economic Affairs
- Council (Majelis) of Media and Information

Regional Leadership

The Regional Leadership manages the organization at the provincial level. Its leadership structure consists of:

- Guide (Mursyid) of Education and Teaching
- Guide (Mursyid) of Da‘wah
- Guide (Mursyid) of Social and Economic Affairs
- Guide (Mursyid) of Media and Information

Branch Leadership

The Branch manages the organization at the district/regency level. Its leadership structure consists of:

- Committee (Lajnah) of Education and Teaching
- Committee (Lajnah) of Da‘wah
- Committee (Lajnah) of Social and Economic Affairs
- Committee (Lajnah) of Media and Information
