= Ahmad al-Muhajir =

Muslim scholar and teacher during the Islamic Golden Age

Imam, Sayyid Ahmad Al-Muhajir
- أحمد المهاجر
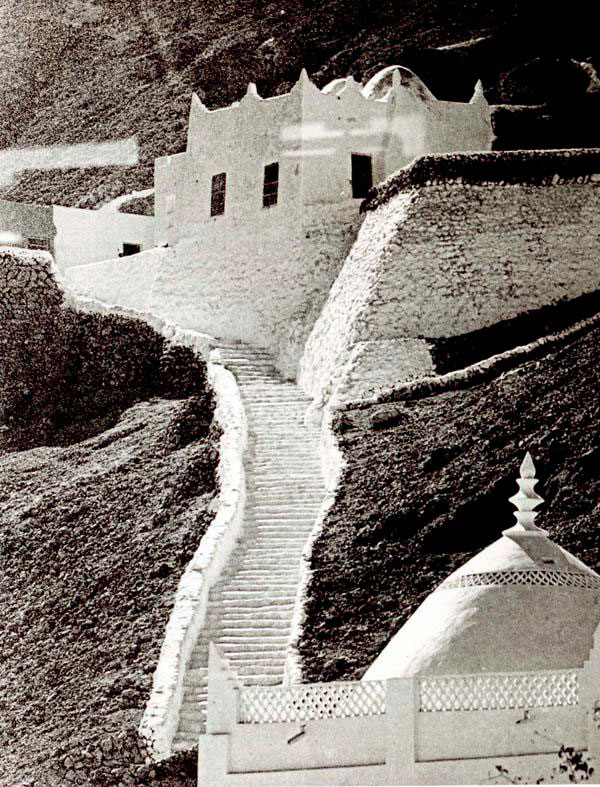
- Mausoleum of Ahmad bin Isa Al-Muhajir
- Born: Ahmad ibn Isa; 873 CE; Basra, Iraq
- Died: 956 (aged 82–83) al-Husaisa, Yemen
- Burial place: Shi'ab Al-Muhajir, al-Husaisa, Yemen; 15.9842691°N 48.8697778°W
- Occupations: Islamic scholar, teacher
- Era: Islamic Golden Age (Middle Abbasid era)
- Known for: Spreading Sunni Islam in Hadhramaut, Establishing the house of Ba 'Alawi
- Children: Muhammad; Ali; Husayn; Ubaidillah
- Parent: Isa al-Rumi (father)
- Arabic name
- Personal (Ism): Aḥmad
- Patronymic (Nasab): Aḥmad al-Muhājir ibn ʿĪsā ar-Rūmī ibn Muḥammad an-Naqīb ibn ʿAlī al-ʿUrayḍī ibn Jaʿfar aṣ-Ṣādiq ibn Muḥammad al-Bāqir ibn ʿAlī Zayn al-ʿĀbidīn ibn al-Ḥusayn ibn ʿAlī ibn Abī Ṭālib
- Teknonymic (Kunya): Abu Muḥammad
- Epithet (Laqab): al-Muhājir (lit. 'emigrant')

Ahmad al-Muhajir (Arabic: أحمد المهاجر, Aḥmad al-muhāǧir, Arabic pronunciation: [ɑhmɑd ɑl muhɑːdʒiɽ]; 260-345 AH or c. 873-956 CE), also known as al-Imām Aḥmad ibn ʿĪsā, was an Islamic scholar and the founder of Ba 'Alawi sada group which is instrumental in spreading Islam to India, Southeast Asia and Africa. He was the son of 'Isa the son of Muhammad the son of Ali al-Uraydi who was the fourth son of Imam Ja'far al-Sadiq, a fifth generation descendant of Ali and Fatima, the daughter of Muhammad. He was a known acquaintance of Bishr al-Ḥāfī.

== Early life ==
According to another history, he is thought to have been born in 241 Hijrah (854 CE)., but this seems to be weaker opinion. Aḥmad grew up under the supervision of his parents in an environment surrounded by scholars and living examples of prophetic character. He memorized the Qur'an and then mastered the sciences of the sacred law until he reached the rank mujtahid. He also had his own hadith collection (musnad, not to be confused with Musnad Ahmad) and was held in great esteem by the Sunni Imam Al-Tabari.

== Migration ==
Al-Imam Aḥmad ibn Isa is called al-Muhâjir (emigrant) because he left Basra, Iraq during the Abbasid Caliphate that was headquartered in Baghdad in the year 317H (929 CE). Aḥmad ibn Isa left Basra with a group of 70 people. He left his three sons Muḥammad, Ali and Husayn in Iraq to take care of their wealth and property.

He first went to Medina and Mecca, and then from Mecca to Yemen in around 319 H. He migrated at a time when there was much internal strife, bloodshed and confusion in Iraq, where a large number of the descendants of Muhammad were persecuted for political reasons by the ruling Abbasids and also because there was turmoil due to revolt against Abbasids ruling by members of the Qaramita.

He set out for Yemen in 319 H with his party and eventually reach Hadhramaut, while Aḥmad al-Qudaymi settled in northern Yemen and Sharif Muḥammad ibn Sulayman in Tihama on the Red Sea coast. He first settled in the village of Jubayl and then Hajrayn. Next he traveled to the village Qarat Bani Jushayr and finally settled in al-Husayyisah near Seiyun.

== School of thought ==
There is a controversy about what Madhhab followed by Aḥmad ibn ʻIsa. Most ulama (Islamic scholars) have the opinion that he was a Sunni imam. Some other ulama such as Imam ʻAbd al-Raḥman ibn ʻUbayd Allah al-Saqqāf, Habib Ṣalih al-Ḥamid, and Sayyid ʻAbd Allah ibn Ṭāhir al-Ḥaddād (brother of Habib Alwi bin Thahir al-Haddad, Mufti of Johor) and some others contend that he was a Zaydi follower. However all of his descendants in Hadhramaut followed Shafi'i jurisprudence.

Regarding what Madhab of law he followed, Habib Abd al-Rahman ibn Ubayd Allah al-Saqqaf emphasized that al-Muhâjir was not Sunni Shafi'i in fiqh, as Imam Aḥmad ibn Isa is a Mujtahid, he does not need to follow any madhhabs.

== Descendants and status ==
The Habaib from the family of Ba 'Alawi sada of Yemen traced their descent to Aḥmad al-Muhâjir through his grandson, Alawi "Sahib al-Sumal" ibn Ubayd Allah.

Alawi ibn Ubayd Allah or also known as Alawi al-Awwal (The first Alawi) was the first of his descendants to be born in Yemen (one version says he was born in al-Husaisa, another version says he was born in Sumal) The word Bā in Ba 'Alawi sada is a strict Hadhrami term meaning the descendants of.

The descendants of Alawi ibn Ubayd Allah are referred to as Aal Bani Alawi.

Currently, descendants of Imam Aḥmad through Alawi ibn Ubayd Allah spread out mostly to Yemen, Oman, Saudi Arabia, Africa,Kenya,Tanzania, Southeast Asia, and South Asia. Some of the prominent descendants of Imam Aḥmad are Imam Muhammad al-Faqih al-Muqaddam in the 13th century, Sayyid Abu Bakr al-Aydarus of Tarim and Azmatkhan in India, Sunan Ampel in Indonesia in 15th century, Imam Abd Allah ibn Alawi al-Haddad in the 17th century, Raden Saleh bin Yahya in the 19th century Haidar Abu Bakr al-Attas who was prime minister of Yemen, Habib Umar bin Hafiz of Tarim, Habib Ali al-Jifri of Jeddah in the 21st century. Some of his descendants in Indonesia, among others, are Sayyid Abdullah Al-Aidarus, Habib Ali Kwitang, Ali Alatas, Alwi Shihab, and Hamid Algadri.

Imam Aḥmad al-Muhâjir is an Imam Mujtahid, which means he is regarded as a primary source for rulings on religious matters.

== Later life and death ==
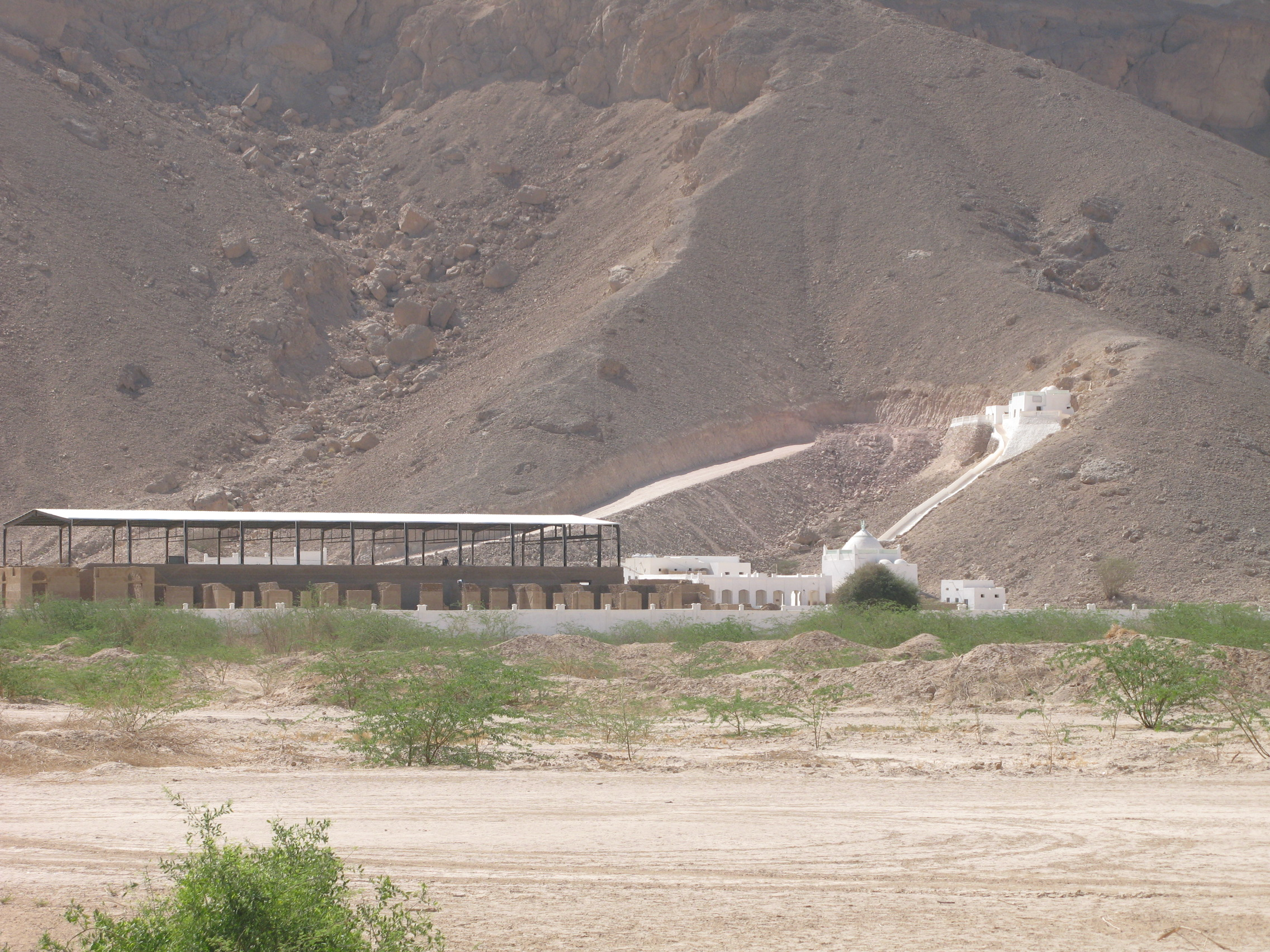
The Mausoleum of al-Muhajir in Al-Husaisa

Imam al-Muhâjir arrived in Hadhramaut at a time when an offshoot of the Kharijite sect called Ibadiyyah held political power and had widespread influence throughout the valley. He persevered in the spreading of Islamic truths until he almost single-handedly removed the Ibadi sect from Hadhramaut without ever taking up arms against them.

He died in 345 H or 956 CE in al-Husaisah, a town between Tarim and Seiyun, Hadhramaut. His shrine stands on a hill and is among the first shrines that visitors to Hadhramaut pay their respects to when visiting the area.
