= Muhammad al-Faqih al-Muqaddam =

Scholar and Founder of the Ba 'Alawi Tariqah

al-Faqih al-Muqaddam Sayyid Muhammad ibn Ali Ba 'Alawi
- Born: 574 H / 1178 CE; Tarim, Hadhramaut, Yemen
- Died: 653/1255; Tarim
- Resting place: Zanbal, Hadhramaut
- Citizenship: Yemeni
- Occupations: Islamic scholar, Sufi
- Known for: Founder of Ba 'Alawiyya sufi order
- Title: Imam
- Spouse: Zaynab bint Ahmad ibn Muhammad Sahib al-Mirbat
- Children: Alawi al-Ghayur; Ali; Ahmad; Abd Allah; Abd al-Rahman
- Father: Sayyid Ali ibn Muhammad Sahib al-Mirbat Ba 'Alawi

Muḥammad ibn ʿAlī Bā ʿAlawī (Arabic: محمد بن علي باعلوي) commonly known as al-Faqīh al-Muqaddam (Arabic: الفقيه المقدم), Arabic pronunciation: [muˈħammɑd al-faˈqiːh al-ˈmuqaddam]; 574 H - 653 H or 1178 CE - 1232 CE) is known as the founder of Ba 'Alawiyya Sufi order which has influenced Sufism in Yemen, South Asia and Southeast Asia. He is the only son of Ali son of Muhammad Sahib al-Mirbath whom all 75 families of Ba 'Alawi sada that spread out from Yemen to Southeast Asia are rooted.

== Epithet ==
The Title al-Faqih was given because he was a great teacher and student of religion and jurisprudence. One of his teachers, Ali Bamarwan said that he mastered the science of jurisprudence as great as the former scholar Muhammad ibn al-Hasan ibn al-Shafi'i Furak who died in 406 H.

While the title al-Muqaddam means he is the foremost. In this case, Muhammad ibn Ali throughout his life was always given precedence. His grave located in Zanbal in Hadhramaut is frequently visited by Muslims often before they visit other religious sites in Yemen. It can also means somebody who has been authorized by his murshid to assist in teaching the path to other students (see Muqaddam).

== Life ==
Muhammad al-Faqih al-Muqaddam was born in Tarim into the scholarly and respected Ba 'Alawi sada clan whose ancestors had arrived from Basra in Iraq and initially dwelt in al-Husaisa in Hadhramaut. The Ba 'Alawi sada are Husaynid Sayyids from the lineage of Ali al-Uraydi, the son of Imam Ja'far al-Sadiq, Faqih al-Muqaddam's lineage is as follows; Muhammad Faqih al-Muqaddam son of Ali son of Muhammad Sahib al-Mirbat son of Ali Khali Qasam son of Alawi al-Thani son of Muhammad Sahib al-Sawma'ah son of Alawi al-Awwal son of Abdullah son of Ahmad al-Muhajir son of Isa al-Rumi son of Muhammad al-Naqib son of Ali al-Uraydi son of Ja'far al-Sadiq son of Muhammad al-Baqir son of Ali al-Sajjad son of Husayn al-Sibt son of al-Imam Ali and Fatima al-Zahra, daughter of the Prophet Muhammad.

Muhammad grew up in an environment of knowledge and righteousness, memorizing the Qur'an and mastering the sciences of the Sacred Law in his youth. He studied until became a Mujtahid. He taught and fasted in the daytime, while in the night he spent his nights in one of the caves being busy in meditation in Nu'ayr Valley outside Tarim.

== Teachings ==
Muhammad was the founder of Ba 'Alawiyya tariqa (Sufi order) and the first who introduce Sufism in Yemen. He received his Ijazah from Abu Madyan through one of his prominent students, Abd al-Rahman bin Ahmad al-Hadhrami al-Maghribi (he died before reaching Hadramaut, but it was continued by another Moroccan Sufi he met in Mecca). However, Muhammad al-Faqih did not follow fully Abu Madyan's tariqa, but he combined it with the teachings of his forefathers and the tariqa of Abdul Qadir Gilani.

During his time, Sayyid families in Hadramaut were seen as a threat by other tribes. Due to instability in the region, it was normal during his study that Muhammad bin Ali put a sword on his lap for protection. Muhammad grew tired of the tension and bloodshed in the ranks of the believers thus symbolically broke his sword and announced that his Tariqa and the way of Alawiyyin Sayyids are non-violence and renounced any tariqa that uses violence. It is believed the dissemination of Islam in Southeast Asia was carried out by Sufi traders and clerics of Hadramaut (followers and descendants of Muhammad al-Faqih Muqaddam) who transited in India since 15th century as the Sufism and its influences can be traced strongly in the region.

Among the followers of his teachings and also his descendants that are prominent before 20th century are Imam Abd Allah ibn Alawi al-Haddad and Sayyid Abu Bakr al-Aydarus and in modern time are Habib Umar bin Hafiz and Habib Ali al-Jifri, among others. Another follower in modern time who is not directly descendants of him is Sayyid Muhammad ibn 'Alawi al-Maliki.

== See also ==
- Sa'eed ibn Isa Al-Amoudi

== Bibliography ==
- Ali Qasim Aziz, Muhammad (2004). Medieval Sufism in Yemen: the case of Aḥmad b. ʻAlwân. University of Michigan.
- Bang, Anne (October 17, 2003). Sufis and Scholars of the Sea: Family Networks in East Africa, 1860-1925 (1 ed.). UK: Routledge. p. 272. ISBN 978-0415317634.
- Buxton, Amin (2012). Imams of The Valley. Western Cape, South Africa: Dar al-Turath al-Islami.
- Yadav, Rama Sankar & B.N. Mandal (Jan 1, 2007). Global Encyclopaedia of Education. Global Vision Publishing House. p. 1185. ISBN 978-8-182202276.
