= Al-Husaisa =

al-Husaisa الحسيسه
- Village
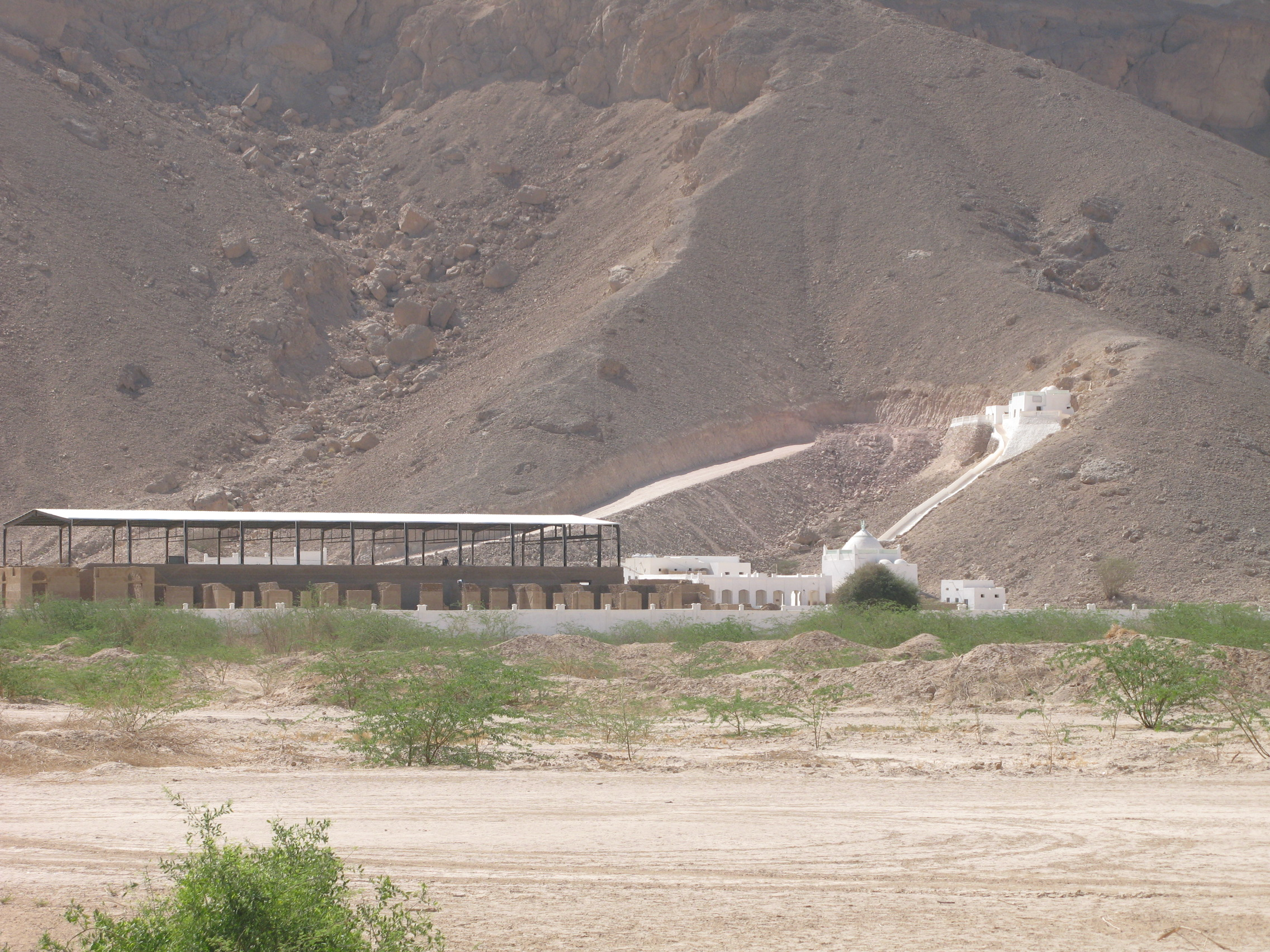
- The Mausoleum of Ahmad al-Muhajir in Al-Husaisa

- Location of Hadhramaut in South Yemen

- al-Husaisa location in Yemen
- Coordinates: 15.985423968718615°N 48.871521949768066°E
- Country: Yemen
- Governorate: Hadramaut
- Directorate: Sayun District
- Elevation: 634 m (2,080 ft)
- Time zone: UTC+3

al-Husaisa (Arabic: الحسيسه) is a village in Hadramaut, Yemen, about 617 kilometres (383 mi) east of the capital city of San'a. It is located 13.3 kilometres (8.3 mi) east of Seiyun and 6.8 kilometres (4.2 mi) west of Taribah. The village is accessible by taking an off-ramp from N-5 highway connecting Seiyun and Tarim. It is about 24 kilometres (15 mi) from Tarim heading west.

The village is very sparse as there is only a few houses built and some farms. The village is known as the place where the Shrine of Imam Ahmad al-Muhajir or Rubath al-Muhajir (Arabic: رباط المهاجر) is located.
