= Ba 'Alawiyya =

Sufi mystic order in Sunni Islam

The Ba 'Alawiyya (Arabic: طريقة آل باعلوي), also known as the Ba Alawiyya tariqa, is a Sufi order centered in Hadhramawt, Yemen, but now spread across the Indian Ocean rim along with the Hadhrami diaspora. The order is closely tied to the Ba 'Alawi sada family.

It was founded by al-Faqih Muqaddam As-Sayyid Muhammad bin Ali Ba'Alawi al-Husaini, who died in the year 653 AH (1232 CE). He received his ijazah from the renowned qutb Abu Madyan in Morocco via his students. Abu Madyan was an indirect origin of the Shadhili order as 'Abd al-Salam ibn Mashish, the shaykh of Abu al-Hasan al-Shadhili, was a disciple of Abu Madyan's disciple 'Abd al-Rahman al-Madani. The members of this Sufi way are mainly sayyids whose ancestors hail from the valley of Hadramaut, in eastern Yemen, although it is not limited to them.

The chain of ijazah of spiritual Sufi transmission from al-Faqih Muqaddam Sayyid Muhammad traces back to the Islamic prophet Muhammad via his cousin Ali and from him, his son Husain.

== Origin ==
The name Ba 'Alawi itself is a Hadhrami contraction of the terms Bani 'Alawi or the Clan of 'Alawi.

In the early fourth century Hijri at 318 H, Sayyid Ahmad al-Muhaajir bin Isa bin Muhammad al-Naqib bin Ali al-Uraydi bin Ja'far al-Sadiq migrated from Basrah, Iraq first to Mecca and Medina, and then to Hadhramout, to avoid the chaos then prevalent in the Abbasid Caliphate, where descendants of Muhammad were continuously being suspected of arson and revolt against the caliph. Most descendants of Muhammad known as sayyids gathered much followings due to their vast knowledge of Islam and its teachings, both esoteric and exoteric. Although such personalities may not have political ambitions, having huge followings means that they always attract the suspicions of the caliphate.

The name 'Alawi refers to the grandson of Sayyid Ahmad al-Muhajir, who was the first descendant of Husain, Muhammad's grandson, to be born in Hadramaut and the first to bear such a name.

Thus all the 'Alawi sayyids of Hadramaut are his progeny, and his descendants has since spread far and wide to the Arabian Peninsula, India especially in the Southern state of Kerala along the Malabar Coasts, North and West Coast of Africa (the Islamic Maghreb), and the countries of the Malay Archipelago (Malaysia and Indonesia) spreading Sunni Islam of the Shafii school and the Ba'Alawi Tariqah brand of Sufism.

Ba 'Alawiyya Sufi order, according to historians, is linked to Madyaniyya Sufi order and Ghazaliyya. It is also influenced by Qadiriyya, all because the founder, Muhammad al-Faqih al-Muqaddam received the spiritual transmissions from them. Hadhramaut during his life was torn by constant tribal fights. al-Muqaddam advised the descendants of the Sayyid to abandon arms and wars and instead to pursue religious and moral values. As the founding father of the Sufism in Hadhramaut, he received the title of the Qutb al-Irshad wa Ghausil al-'Ibad Wa al-Bilad (Arabic: قطب الارشاد وغوث العباد والبلاد) of the Ba 'Alawiyya Sufi order, which is the highest rank in Sufism (see also Abdal). Initially, the followers of Ba 'Alawiyya functioned secretly for about five centuries. It was through the Ba 'Alawiyya Scholars that Islam was spread to different parts of the World, particularly in Indonesia through the Wali Songo and the Philippines through the Lumpang Basih.

== Doctrines ==
Like many other Sufi orders, Ba 'Alawi order supports the doctrine of outward (zahir) and inward (batin). The outward aspect of this tariqa consists of pursuing religious sciences and ritual practices while its inward aspect is the attainment of Sufi stations (maqamat) and states (ahwal). The outward aspect follows Al-Ghazali's practices as described in his Ihya Ulum al-Deen, while the inward aspect is similar to Shadhiliyya Sufi order.

The basic doctrine of Ba 'Alawiyya is the purification of heart through knowledge, practice, sincerity, fear of Allah, and scrupulousness.It also emphasizes the teaching and practicing perfect character as exemplified by Muhammad.

Imam Ahmad bin Isa al-Muhajir and his son, according to majority of historians, spread the legal school of Shafi'i and Ash'ari for theology.

R.B. Serjeant summarizes the main points of Ba 'Alawiyya tariqa: The Sayyids affirm it is the best Tariqa based on al-Qur'an and Sunnah and the beliefs of pious ancestors (al-Aslaf Shalihin), but act with humility, piety and lofty motive. The follower must love obscurity, dislike manifestation, withdraw from madding crowd, but he still has to warn and advice in matters of religious duty. He must also show kindness to his family, relatives, neighbors, friends, acquaintances, tribes and to all other Muslims.

The tradition was transmitted orally in its first generation, so no books were written. Later on, transmission through writing became more important to clarify some obscurity. Books such as al-Burqa, al-Ma'arij, al-Kibrit al-Ahmar, al-Juz al-Latif were then written to preserve the gradual disappearance of the tariqa. The tariqa also teaches the adherents to give da'wah and disseminate Islam peacefully without violence. This explains why Islam could have spread easily in South East Asian countries and was accepted by the indigenous people, where the followers brought Islam peacefully and mostly through trading and marriage (this because the men did not bring their wives abroad).

Annual spiritual activities such as Mawlid, haul (anniversary commemoration of the death of a family member or to highly respected persons in the community), or practices performed routinely such as Majlis Dhikr (Dhikr assemblies, usually by reciting dhikr or wirid such as Wird al-Latif or Ratib by Habib Abdullah bin Alwi al-Haddad after every Fajr and Maghrib time), Tahlil (another form of Dhikr assembly, but usually is performed if somebody dies), Reading of classical Islamic books, and Ziyarat are practices followed by Ba 'Alawiyya. During these events it is not uncommon to see Haḍras and Qasidas also recited and sometimes accompanied with Rebanas. Some of the above practices (such as mawlid or qasida) even performed in wedding ceremonies by Ba 'Alawi communities.

The influences of Ba 'Alawi tariqa can be found also in a few large Islamic organizations. For example, the spiritual practices performed by members of Nahdlatul Ulama such as Tahlil, mawlid or ziyarat are all influenced by and can be traced back to the Ba 'Alawiyya teachings, where Hadhrami of Ba 'Alawiyya migrated and taught the tariqa in Java since the 18th century.

Some of the prominent figures of this tariqa are:

- Muhammad al-Faqih al-Muqaddam
- Abu Bakr al-Aydarus
- Abd Allah ibn Alawi al-Haddad
- Al-habib Swaleh ibn Alwy ibn Abdallah Jamal al-Layl
- al-Habib Ahmad bin Zayn al-Habshi
- Muhammad Alawi al-Maliki
- Habib Umar bin Hafiz
- Habib Ali al-Jifri

In Hadhramaut, the teaching of this tariqa is done in several Ribath, such as Ribath Tarim or at Dar al-Mustafa founded by Habib Umar bin Hafiz.

== See also ==
- List of Sufi orders
- Habib Umar bin Hafiz
- Habib Ali al Jifri
- Habib Salih
- Ba 'Alawi sada
