= Taribah =

Taribah تاربه
- Town
- Location of Hadhramaut in South Yemen

- Taribah location in Hadhramaut
- Coordinates: 15.98103°N 48.92532°E
- Country: Yemen
- Governorate: Hadramaut
- Directorate: Sayun District
- Elevation: 627 m (2,057 ft)

Population (2004)
  - Total: 3,686
- Time zone: UTC+3

Taribah (Arabic: تاربه, romanized: Tāribah) is a small town in Hadramaut, Yemen, about 511 kilometres (318 mi) East of the capital city of San'a. It is located 20 kilometres (12 mi) east of Seiyun and 13 kilometres (8.1 mi) west of Tarim, Yemen. It consists of three or four villages, some isolated houses and a wide expanse of palm trees.

Many Hadhramis of Taribah have travelled to foreign lands in search of their fortune in life, and have died there. Despite the solitude of interment in distant lands, those who have died overseas are not forgotten in Hadhramaut. It is as if by being remembered, these sons of Taribah have in some manner been returned home.

A strange phenomenon is sometimes noticeable in Masjid Badr in the town, especially during the silent afternoon prayers of dhuhr or ‘asr. While the prayer is in progress, faint yet distinct whispers can be heard clearly, apparently coming from all directions at once. The intensity of the whispers never changes - even when one is in solitary prayer, the whispers can be heard at a constant level. And even more intriguing, the whispers are only heard when one is praying.
