= Al-Fils fort =

- حصن الفلس
- Interactive map of Al-Fils fort

General information
- Location: حصن الفلس, Seiyun, Yemen, Seiyun, Yemen
- Coordinates: 15.944175°N 48.799991°E

Al-Fils fort is a fort in Seiyun, Yemen.
