= Abu Bakr Al-Aidarus =

Abu Bakr Al-Aidarus (also spelled as Al-Aidrus, Al-Aydarus or Al-Idrus) is the name of several Hadharem:

- Abu Bakr al-Aydarus (1447–1508), patron saint of Aden and founder of the al-Aydarus clan
- Abu Bakr al-Aydarus, tuan besar of Aceh, lived in the 16th century
- Abu Bakr al-Aydarus, Indonesian wali or Sufi saint, Muslim scholar, and father of Hussain bin Abu Bakr Al-Aidarus (died 1798)
