= Al-Muhdhar Mosque =

Historic mosque in Tarim, Yemen

- Masjid Al-Muḥḍār (مَسْجِد ٱلْمُحْضَار); Masjid Al-Miḥḍār (مَسْجِد ٱلْمِحْضَار)
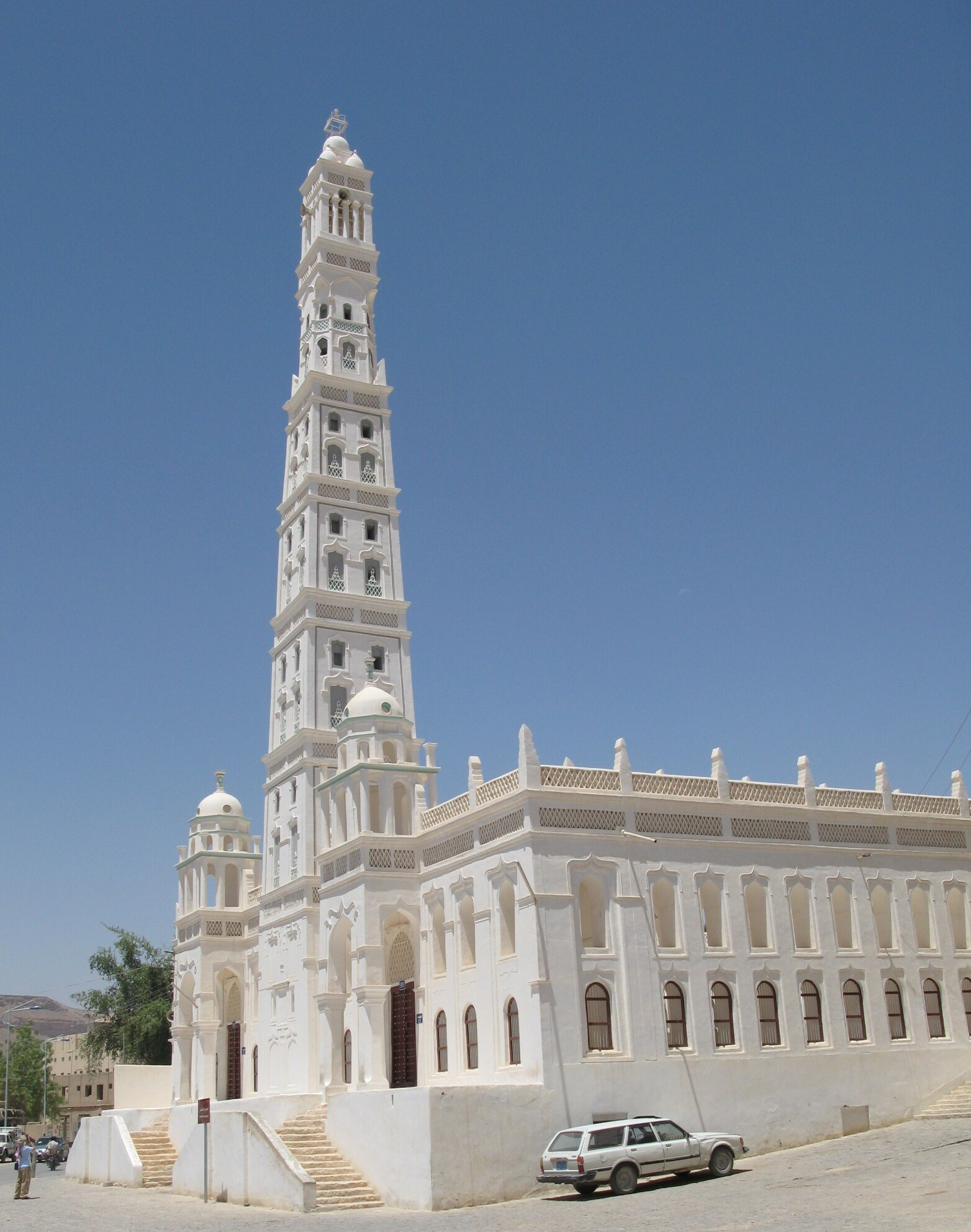
- An image of the Mosque

- Location in Yemen Al-Muhdhar Mosque (Middle East) Al-Muhdhar Mosque (West and Central Asia)

Religion
- Affiliation: Islam
- Region: Hadhramaut, South Arabia
- Status: Active

Location
- Location: Tarim, Hadhramaut Governorate, Yemen
- Coordinates: 16°3′16.28″N 48°59′54.16″E

Architecture
- Architect: 'Awad Salman 'Afif al-Tarimi (minaret)
- Type: Mosque
- Style: Islamic
- Completed: 1914

Specifications
- Minaret: 1
- Minaret height: 53 metres (174 ft)
- Materials: Adobe

Al-Muhdar Mosque (Arabic: مَسْجِد ٱلْمُحْضَار, romanized: Masjid Al-Muḥḍār) or Al-Mihdar Mosque (Arabic: مَسْجِد ٱلْمِحْضَار, romanized: Masjid Al-Miḥḍār) is one of the historical mosques in the ancient city of Tarim, in the Yemeni province of Hadramaut. It is attributed to Omar Al-Mihdar bin Abdul-Rahman Al-Saqqaf (Arabic: عُمَر ٱلْمِحْضَار بِن عَبْد ٱلرَّحْمَٰن ٱلسَّقَّاف, romanized: ʿUmar al-Miḥḍār bin ʿAbd Ar-Raḥmān As-Saqqāf), a Muslim leader who lived in the city during the 15th century.

== Architecture ==
The building is characterized by Islamic geometric design. Its layout consists of an open courtyard surrounded by four corridors, the biggest of which contains the qiblah, which is adorned with three exquisite frescoes decorated with geometric, floral and scriptural motifs. In the center of the qibla corridor, there is the iconic minaret, which at about 50 metres (160 feet) high is the highest mudbrick structure on Earth. It is square-shaped and there is a staircase reaching to the top inside. It was built around 1914 C.E. (1333 A.H.), and is built of adobe. This minaret was designed by the architect 'Awad Salman 'Afif al-Tarimi (Arabic: عَوَض سَلْمَان عَفِيْف ٱلتَّرِيْمِي, romanized: ʿAwaḍ Salmān ʿAfīf At-Tarīmī), who had already carried out many designs and constructions of clay lattices and domes, and the maintenance and supervision were conducted by Abu Bakr bin Shihab (d. 1345 AH). It is considered one of the most important architectural sites and destinations for visitors and researchers of the city of Tarim.

=== Al-Ahqaf Library ===
Al-Ahqaf Library occupies the ground floor of the mosque building, which was built to accommodate the need to store the large number of manuscripts in the city of Tarim and neighboring cities. Tarim has been considered a distinguished Islamic scientific center since the 10th century in Wadi Hadramaut region.

== See also ==
- List of mosques in Yemen
