= Qasr al-'Ishshah =

Coordinates: 16.0553752°N 48.9993705°E

Qasr al-'Ishshah Palace
- قَصْر ٱلْعِشَّة
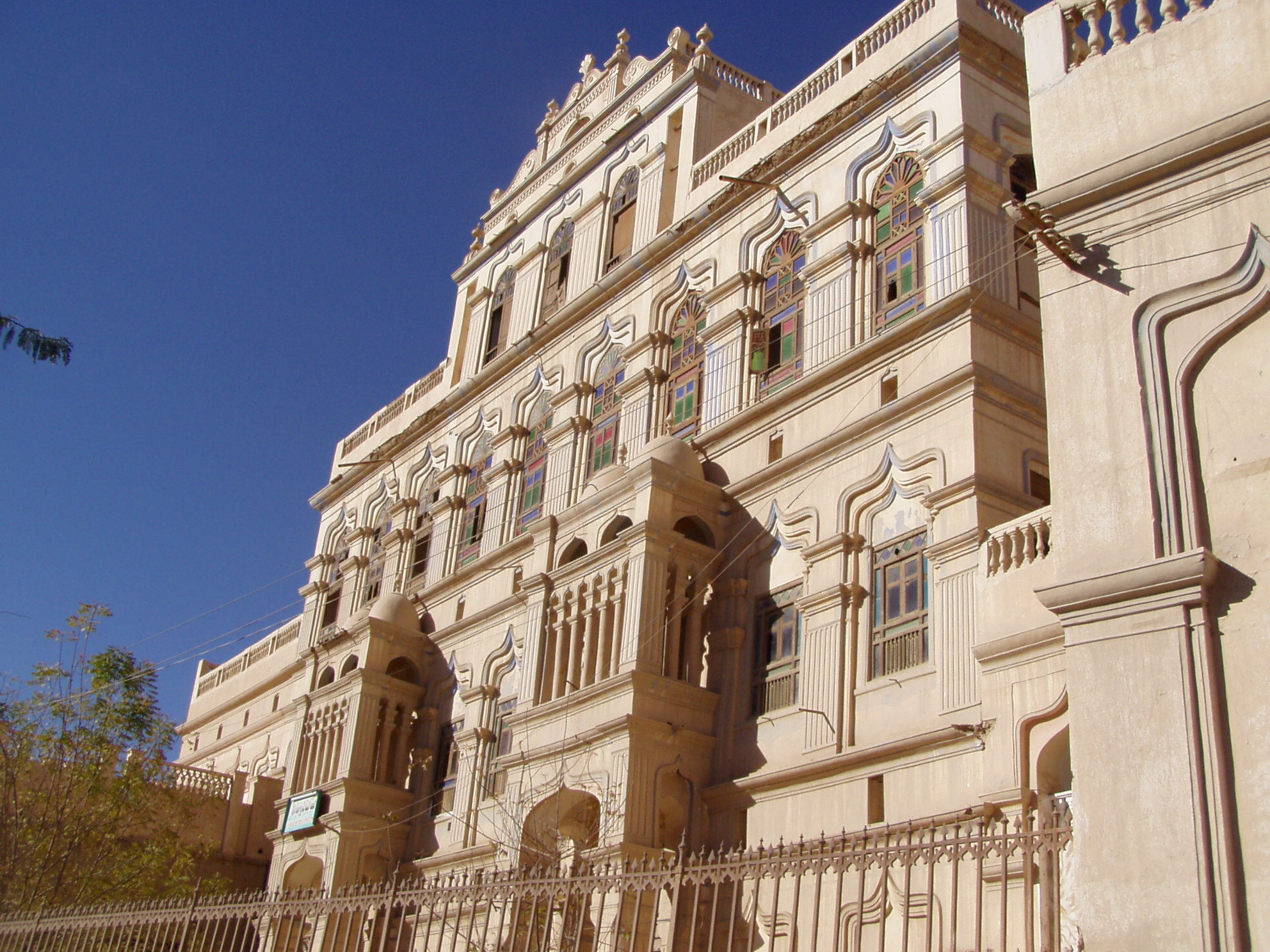
- Interactive map of Qasr al-'Ishshah Palace

General information
- Architectural style: Hadhrami, Southeast Asian, Colonial
- Location: Tarim, Yemen
- Completed: 1890s
- Owner: 'Umar bin Shaikh Al-Kaff

Design and construction
- Architect: Alawi bin Abu Bakr al-Kaff

Qasr al-'Ishshah (Arabic: قَصْر ٱلْعِشَّة, romanized: Qaṣr al-ʿIshshah) is a palace complex in Tarim of 'Umar bin Shaikh Al-Kaff, one of the first al-Kaff houses. Shaikh al-Kaff built the house on proceeds made in South Asian trade and investment in Singapore's Grand Hotel de l'Europe during the 1930s.

== Etymology ==
'Ishshah derives from the Arabic root ʿ-sh-sh (Arabic: عشّ), meaning to nest, take root, or establish.

== History ==
Qasr al-'Ishshah is a collection of several buildings constructed over forty years. The first building, Dar Dawil, was built in the 1890s. As Umar's family grew, so did the size of the complex.

From 1970 to 1991, Qasr al-'Ishshah was nationalized by the government of the People's Democratic Republic of Yemen and the palace was divided up as multi-family housing. The house was then returned to Al-Kaff family, and legal ownership rights are shared amongst many of Shaikh al-Kaff's descendants. In 1997, the Historical Society for the Preservation of Tarim rented half of the house to present the building to the public as a house museum, the only one of its kind in the Hadhramaut.

== Architecture ==
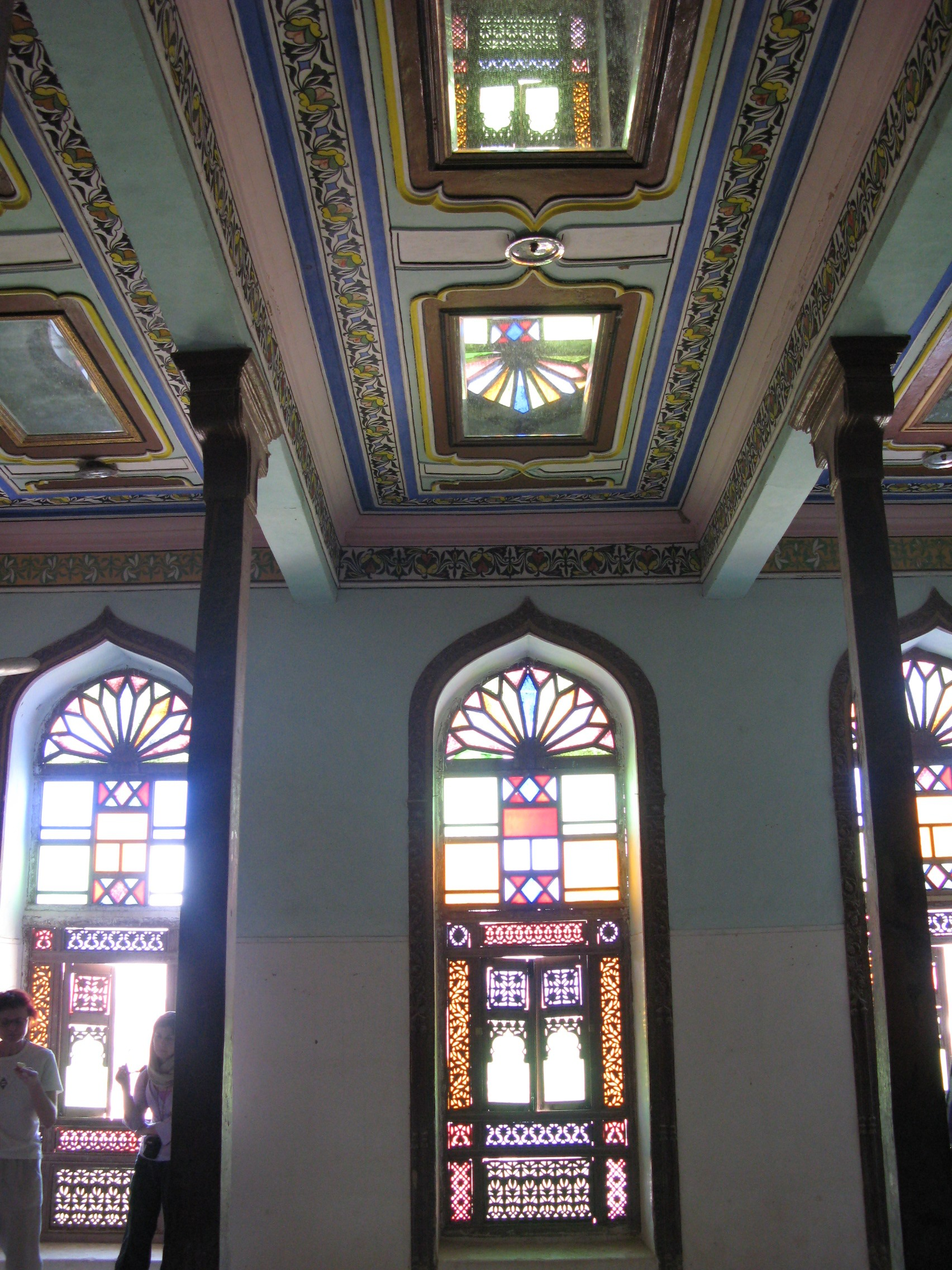
Interior of the Palace

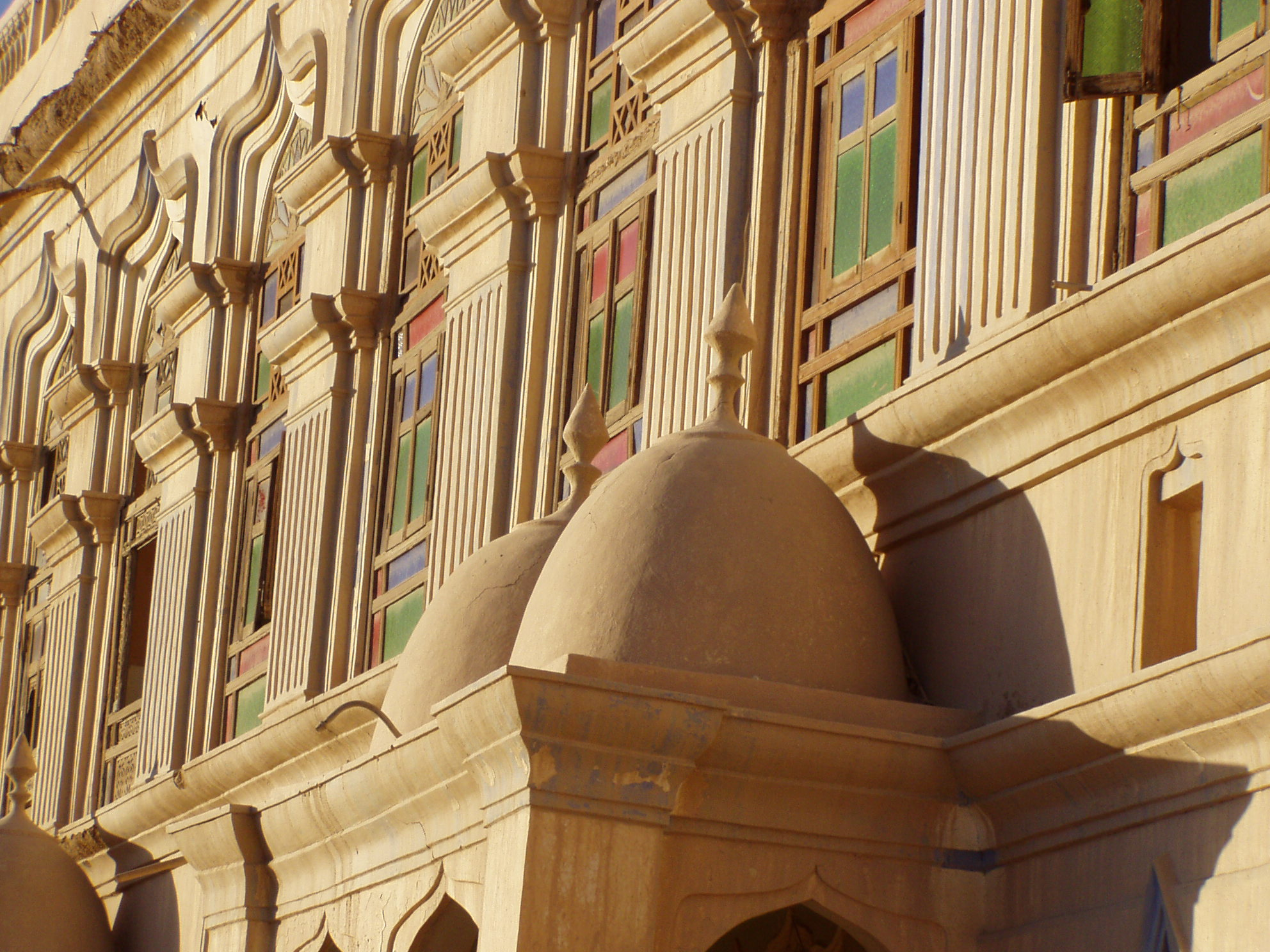
Detailed view of the palace

Qasr al-'Ishshah exhibits some of the finest examples of lime plaster decoration (malas) in Tarim. The decorative program of the exterior south façade finds its antecedents in Mughal royal architecture, as well as the colonial forms of the Near East, South Asia and Southeast Asia. Interior stucco decoration differs from room to room, including Art Nouveau, Rococo, Neo-Classical and combinations of the three. The ornamentation often incorporates pilasters along the walls framing openings, built-in cabinetry with skilled wood carvings, elaborate column capitals, decorated ceilings, niches and kerosene lamp holders, as well as complex color schemes.
