= Aidrus Mosque =

Mosque in Crater Aden, Yemen

- Jāmiʿ Al-ʿAydarūs (جَامِع ٱلْعَيْدَرُوْس)
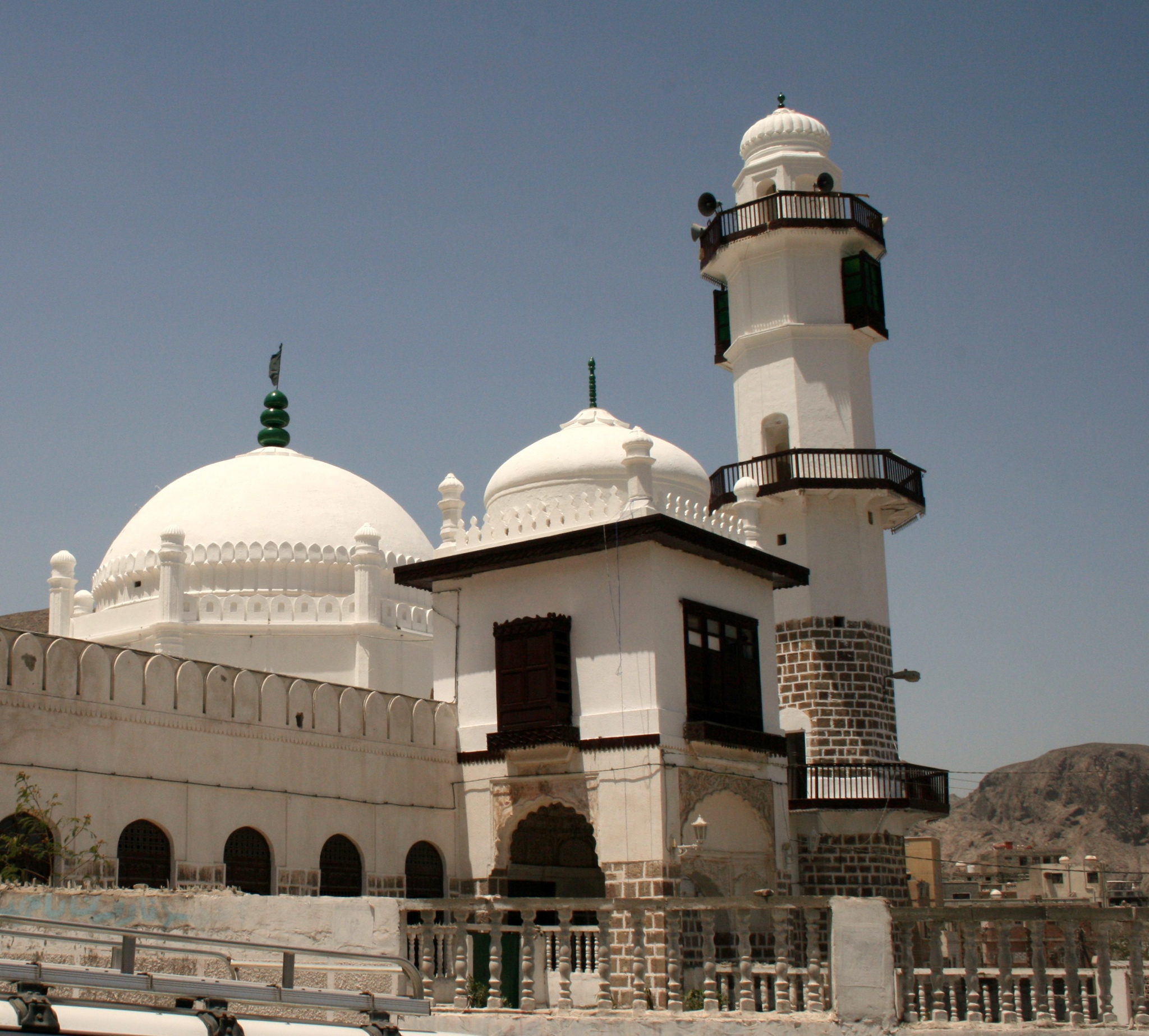

- Location in Yemen Aidrus Mosque (Middle East) Aidrus Mosque (West and Central Asia)

Religion
- Affiliation: Islam
- Branch/tradition: Sunni

Location
- Location: Crater Aden, Yemen
- Interactive map of Aidrus Mosque
- Coordinates: 12°46′20.64″N 45°2′11.04″E

Architecture
- Type: Mosque

The Mosque of Abu Bakr al-'Aydarus or Aidrus Mosque (Arabic: جَامِع ٱلْعَيْدَرُوْس, romanized: Jāmiʿ Al-ʿAydarūs) is a Sufi mosque in Aidrus Street in Crater, Yemen. One of the principal mosques in Aden, it is named after Abu Bakr al-Aydarus, the wali (saint) of Aden.

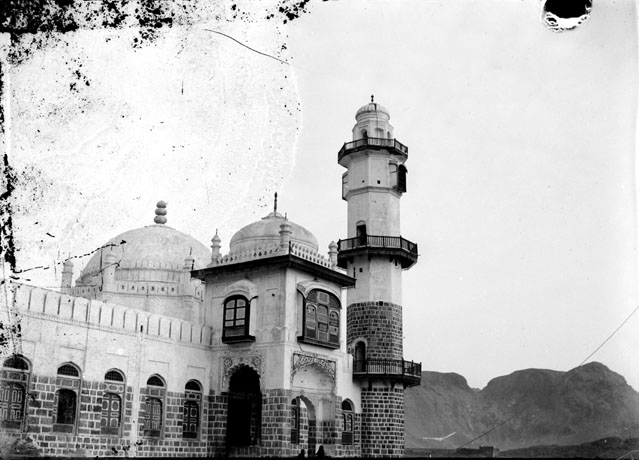

Originally built in the late-15th or early-16th century, the mosque underwent rebuilding after being destroyed in 1859. During the 1994 civil war in Yemen, Islamic fundamentalists from North Yemen damaged much of the mosque, burning copies of the Quran and vandalizing tombs in its courtyard.

The mosque is featured on some Aden postage stamps, e.g. the 1938 2 anna stamp.

== See also ==
- List of mosques in Yemen
