= Ba 'Alawi sada =

Group of Hadhrami Sayyid families

House of Ba 'Alawi آل باعلوي (Arabic)
- Parent family: Banu Hashim
- Origin: Hadhramaut, Yemen
- Founder: Ahmad al-Muhajir
- Titles: Sayyid, Habib
- Members: see #List of Families
- Traditions: Ba'Alawi tariqa

The Ba 'Alawi sada (Arabic: سادة باعلوي, romanized: sādat bā 'alawiy, lit. 'the descendants of ‘Alawi'), or the House of Ba 'Alawi (Arabic: آل باعلوي, romanized: Āl Bā 'alawiy), is a group of Hadhrami Sayyid families and social group originating in Hadhramaut in the southwest corner of the Arabian Peninsula. They trace their lineage to Ahmad al-Muhajir, himself a descendant of Muhammad, who emigrated from Basra to Hadhramaut in 931 (318H). Classical scholars of Islam such as Ibn Hajar al-Haytami, Yusuf al-Nabhani and Murtada al-Zabidi have validated the genealogy of the Ba Alawi Sada.

They follow the Ahl al-Sunnah wal-Jama'ah methodology on the Shafi'i school in jurisprudence, and the Ash'ari school in faith, and they have their own way of seeking God, which is the Al-Baalawi Tariqah, one of the Sufi orders spread in the Islamic world.

The Ba 'Alawis or Bani 'Alawi are known for preaching Islam. The founder of their order was Muhammad bin Ali Ba 'Alawi, known as "Al-Faqih Al-Muqaddam", who, during his time, Sayyid families in Hadhramaut were seen as a threat by other tribes. Due to regional instability, it was normal during his study that Muhammad bin Ali put a sword on his lap for protection. Muhammad grew tired of the tension and bloodshed in the ranks of the believers, thus symbolically broke his sword and announced that his Tariqa and the way of Alawi Sayyids are non-violence and renounced any tariqa that uses violence. It is believed the dissemination of Islam in Southeast Asia was carried out by traders and clerics of Hadhramaut who transited in India since 15th century as the Sufism, their practices and its influences can be traced strongly to the region.

They were at the top of the social ladder in Hadhramaut because of their esteemed lineage, significant social and financial contributions, and their influence, spreading the principles of Islam to the people, establishing mosques and religious schools, and advancing knowledge through intellectual centers, which solidified their prominent position in the society.

== Etymology ==
The origin of the name Ba 'Alawi goes back to one of their ancestors, Alawi bin 'Ubaydillah bin Ahmad al-Muhajir, the first of al-Muhajir's descendants to be named 'Alawi. The use of the name Ba 'Alawi came after they were influenced by the Hadharem in their way of referring to their fathers, and the meaning of (Ba) among the Hadharem is "children of".

However, the Ba 'Alawis do not use these two surnames except in biographies and genealogies, and a person is usually attributed to his tribe, but there are some individuals from Bani Alawi who are still called Ba 'Alawi because they do not belong to any of the known tribes.

The word Sadah or Sadat (Arabic: سادة) is a plural form of word Sayyid (Arabic: سيد), while the word Ba 'Alawi or Bani 'Alawi means descendants of Alawi. In sum, Ba'alawi are Sayyids who have a blood descendant of the Islamic prophet Muhammad through Alawi ibn 'Ubaydillah ibn Ahmad al-Muhajir. Meanwhile, Alawiyyin (Arabic: العلويّن; al-`alawiyyin), a term that is used to describe descendants of Ali bin Abi Talib from Husayn ibn Ali (Sayyids) and Hasan ibn Ali (Sharifs). All people of Ba 'Alawi are Alawiyyin Sayyids through Husayn ibn Ali, but not all people of Alawiyyin family are of Ba 'Alawi. In certain contexts, the term ʿAlawiyyīn is used in a more circumscribed manner by Ba 'Alawis to refer specifically to the descendants of ʿAlawī ibn ʿUbaydillāh ibn Aḥmad al-Muhājir.

== Origin ==
The cultural tradition of the Ba 'Alawi traces the lineage of their people back to Ahmad al-Muhajir. Imam al-Muhajir's grandson Alawi was the first Sayyid to be born in Hadhramaut, and the only one of Imam al-Muhajir's descendants to produce a continued line in Hadhramaut; The lines of his other grandsons in Hadhramaut—Basri (originally named Ismāʿīl) and Jadīd—ceased after a few generations. Accordingly, Imam Al-Muhajir's descendants in Hadhramaut hold the name Bā 'Alawi or Bani 'Alawi ("descendants of Alawi").

Ahmad Al-Muhajir's descendants continued to move through the valley's villages, settling in the village of Sumal for a time before moving to the village of Bayt Jubair. In 521 AH, Ali bin Alawi, known as "Khali' Qasam," a descendant of the Al-Muhajir, moved to the city of Tarim and made it his home for himself and his children. Since then, Tarim has become the headquarters of the Bani Alawi to this day.

The Ba 'Alawi Sadah have since been living in Hadhramaut in Southern Yemen, maintaining the Sunni Creed in the fiqh school of Shafi'i. In the beginning, a descendant of Imam Ahmad al-Muhajir who became scholar in Islamic studies was called Imam, then Sheikh, but later called Habib. The first person from the Bā ʿAlawī clan to be called Habib was Al-Ḥabīb ʿUmar bin ʿAbd al-Raḥmān al-ʿAṭṭās (d. 1072 AH / 1661 CE).

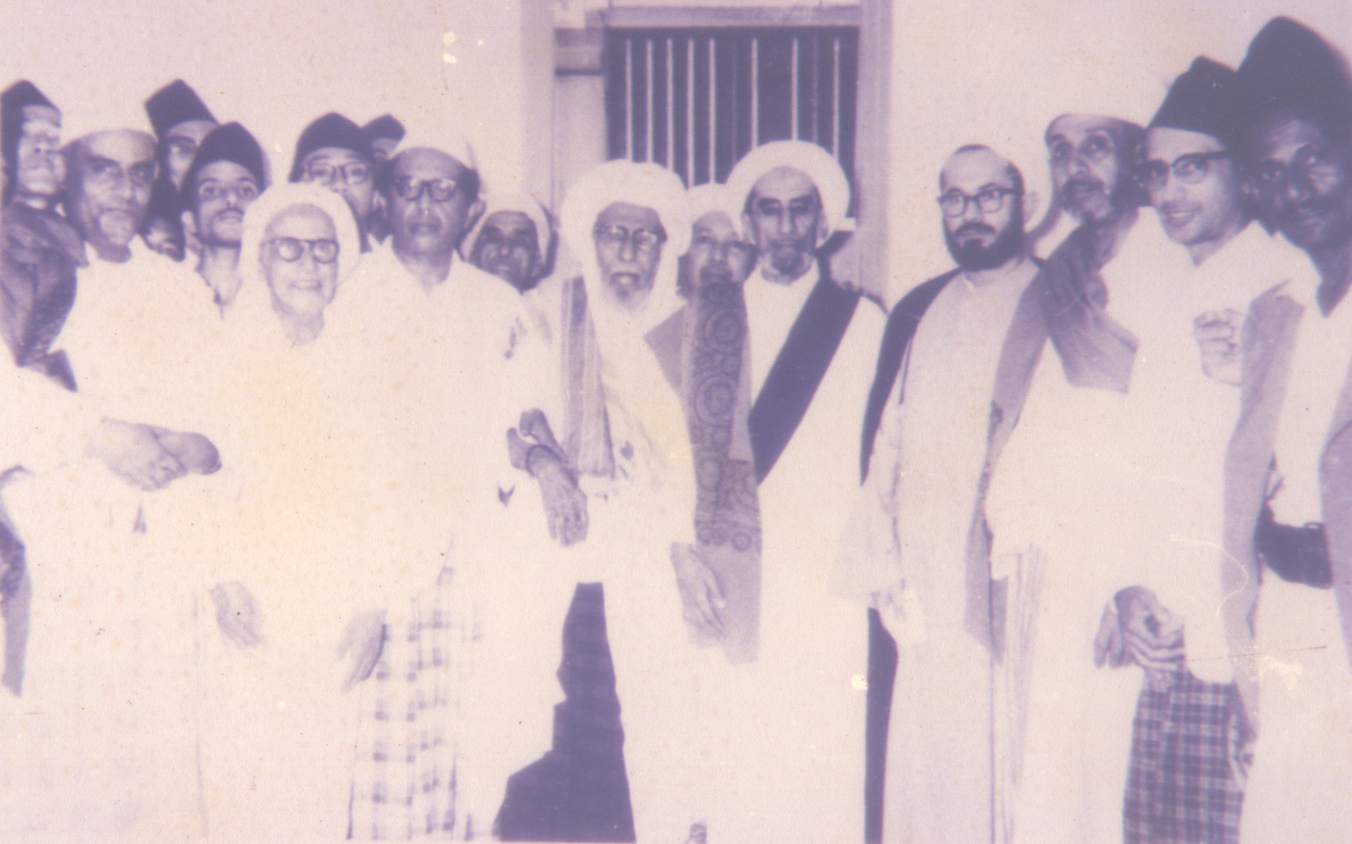
Ba 'Alawi Sada diaspora of Indonesia

It was only since 1700 AD they began to migrate in large numbers out of Hadhramaut across all over the globe, often to practice da'wah (Islamic missionary work). Their travels had also brought them to the Southeast Asia. These Hadhrami immigrants blended with their local societies unusual in the history of diasporas. For example, the House of Jamalullail of Perlis is descended from the Ba 'Alawi. Habib Salih of Lamu, Kenya, was also descended from the Ba 'Alawi. In Indonesia, quite a few of these migrants married local women or men, sometimes nobility or even royal families, and their descendants later became sultans or kings, such as in the Sultanate of Pontianak and the Sultanate of Siak Indrapura. The Sultanates of Sulu, Lanao, and Maguindanao as well trace their origins to Ba Alawi Sada. These Sultanates follow the Shafi'i school of jurisprudence.

== Genealogy ==
According to Ja'far al-Labni, a historian from Mecca: "’Many of the Sayyids living in Mecca and Medina are the Ba 'Alawis, whose lineage became well known in Hadhramaut before spreading beyond it. From Hadhramaut, they migrated to Mecca, Medina, and other lands. These individuals were entrusted with the preservation of genealogies and were well known to the Naqib al-Ashraf in Mecca and Medina. In fact, in recent centuries, the position of Naqib al-Ashraf in these cities has largely been held by members of the Ba ‘Alawi. Wherever they reside, their births are officially recorded, their names are carefully documented, and their genealogies are preserved according to established and well-known procedures. This systematic preservation of lineage serves, among other purposes, to ensure the proper distribution of revenues derived from endowments and similar sources. Other groups from different place also claim descent from the Sayyid lineage, whether Egyptian, Levantine, or Iraqi. Although they are numerous, many are not recognized to the same extent, as their genealogies are not regarded by the wider community as being firmly established, and in some cases the available evidence raises doubts about the validity of their claims.." This is in addition to the Sharifs of Mecca from the prominent Qatadi clan and the Jammaz clan of Medina, who have historically remained in the Hejaz and did not migrate beyond the region.

=== Preserving their genealogy ===
==== Books ====
The genealogies of the Ba Alawis were preserved in a large genealogy ledger located in 15 volumes, compiled by the famous genealogist Abd al-Rahman al-Mashhūr, author of "Shams al-Dhahira" (1340 Hijri) and is still recorded to this day in the Hejaz, Yemen, Southeast Asian countries and East Africa. Its original version was preserved in Tarim in Hadhramaut, and was adopted by the Al-Rabithah Al-Alawiyah (The Association of Alawiyyin) in Jakarta, Indonesia. There is a well-known genealogy ledger reference by al-Musnid 'Idrus ibn 'Umar al-Habshi, and another genealogy ledger reference that was preserved in Mecca and was transcribed by al-Qadi Abu Bakr ibn Ahmad ibn Husayn al-Habshi. In addition to these general genealogical trees, there were also specific genealogical trees for many tribes of Bani Alawi, in which they record their genealogy. At least a dozen other works purport to attest to their genealogy.

=== Lineage ===
After the descendants of Ahmad bin Isa al-Muhajir settled in Tarim, some governors asked them to prove their lineage to confirm what they claimed, and that this should be done by a judicial ruling, and it was said that Tarim had three hundred muftis at that time, so Ali bin Muhammad bin Jadid, who died in 620 AH, traveled to Iraq and proved the lineage to the judges there and witnessed it. Then these witnesses met the Hadhramaut pilgrims in Mecca and testified to them. When these Hadhrami pilgrims came to Hadhramaut and testified to the proof, the people recognized their lineage, and the sheikhs and scholars unanimously agreed on this.

When Ahmad al-Muhajir arrived in Hadhramaut, he still maintained close family ties in Basra, where many of his relatives resided. His son Muhammad remained in Basra to oversee the family's property, together with his other sons, Ali and Hussein. His grandson, Jadid bin 'Ubaydillah (his diminutive real name of Abdullah) later traveled to Basra to inspect these properties and visit family members. Al-Muhajir's children and grandchildren invested in Hadhramaut for many years derived from their holdings in Iraq. They continued to maintain contact with their ancestral homeland and cousins for a few generations, receiving news and accounts that helped preserve their shared heritage and historical memory.

==== Questioning their lineage ====
Centuries later, some questioned their lineage, citing a genealogy book published in the 20th century attributed to Al-Fakhr al-Razi. This book did not mention a son named 'Ubaydillah for Ahmad bin Isa, recording only three sons: Muhammad, Ali, and Hussein.

===== DNA analysis =====
FamilyTreeDNA classified the results of the analysis samples sent to it into different genetic lines based on the male (Y) chromosome and by comparison with other samples that had been examined and classified. When some members of the Ba Alawi performed this genetic analysis, the grand majority of their results revealed the haplogroup G lineage, which is predominantly found in the Caucasus region. A few doubt that their lineage to Muhammad's household is authentic, claiming that the lineage in which Arabs predominate is the haplogroup J1 lineage. However, this opinion is contested as there is no evidence to support the DNA patterns of the true descendants of Muhammad. Numerous other prominent lineages claiming descent from Muḥammad—such as the Jaylanis and others, also exhibit similar genealogical discrepancies.

Genealogist Blaine Bettinger notes, in regards to this case, that "Of course, as all genealogists know, almost none of our conclusions about ancestry/descendancy are 100% proven, especially when they are based at least in part on oral and paper records." He further mentioned, "DNA alone never proves anything. When you ask others to evaluate your genealogical conclusion, providing just the DNA evidence is pointless".

==== Scholars who proved their lineage ====
According to historical sources, many genealogists and historians, such as: Ibn Tabataba, Baha al-Din al-Janadi, Ibn Inabah, Muhammad al-Kadhim Al-Yamani, Muhammad ibn Ahmad ibn Amid al-Din al-Najafi, Siraj al-Din al-Rifai, Shams al-Din al-Sakhawi, Ibn Hajar al-Haytami, Ibn Shadqum, Al-Muhibbi, Yahya Muhammad Hamid ed-Din, the family lineage is connected to Muhammad.

Some authoritative Muslim scholars such as former Mufti of Egypt Shaikh Ali Jum'ah, Sheikh Usamah Al-Azhari of Al-Azhar University in Egypt, Iranian Ayatollah Sayyid Mahdi Rajai, Muhammad Said Ramadhan Al-Bouti, Saudi Arabian genealogists Sharif Ibrahim bin Manshur ِAl-Hashimi Al-Amir and Sharif Anas bin Ya'qub Al-Kutbi, have asserted their opinion that Ba 'Alawi sada family lineage is connected to Muhammad.

== List of families ==
Some of the family names are as follows:

The Family Names of Ba'Alawi
Latin	Arabic
Aṭṭās, al-	العطّاس
Aỳdarūs, al-	العيدروس
ʻAydīd, al-	آل عيديد
Bā ʻaqīl	باعقيل
Al-Maqdi	المقدي
Bā ʻabūd	باعبود
Bār, al-	البار
Bā Surrah	باصره
Bayḍ, al-	البيض
Balfaqīh	بلفقيه
Fadʻaq	فدعق
Ḥibshī, al-	الحبشي
Ḥaddād, al-	الحدّاد
Haddār, al-	الهدار
Hādī, al-	الهادي
Ḥāmid, al-	الحامد

The Family Names of Ba'Alawi (cont.)
Latin	Arabic
Jamalullaīl	جمل الليل
Jufrī, al-	الجفري
Junaīd, al-	الجنيد
Kāf, al-	الكاف
Khanīmān	خنيمان
Maṣhoor, al-	المشهور
Muḥdhār, al-	المحضار
Musāwá, al-	المساوى
Mushayyakh, al-	آل مشيَّخ
Muṭahar	مطهر
Saqqāf, al-	السقاف
Shihāb Uddīn, al-	آل شهاب الدين
Shāṭirī, al-	الشاطري
Shāīkh ābū Bakr, al-	آل الشيخ أبو بكر
Sumaith, bin	بن سميط
Yaḥyá, bin	ابن يحيى

The Family Names of Ba'Alawi (cont.)
Latin	Arabic
Aʻyun, al-	الأعين
Aẓhamāt Khān	عظمة خان
Bā Hāshim, al-	باهاشم
Bā Rūm, al-	الباروم
Bā Sakūt, al-	البا سكوتا
Bā Hāroon Jamalullaīl	باهارون جمل الليل
Bā Raqbah	بارقبة
Bin Hāroon	بن هارون
Bin Hāshim	بن هاشم
Bin Murshed	بن مرشد
Bin Shahel, al-	آل بن سهل
Bin Jindan	بن جندان
Hindūān, al-	الهندوان
Ḥiyyed, al-	الحييد
Ibrāhīm, al-	الإبراهيم
Jadīd	جديد
Khirid, al-	الخرد
Nadhiry, al	ال النضيري

The Family Names of Ba'Alawi (cont.)
Latin	Arabic
ʻAdanī, al-	العدنى
Bā ʻAlawī	باعلوي
Bā Faraj	بافرج
Bā Nahsan	بانحسن
Bā Shaibān	باشيبان
Ba ʻUmar	باعمر
Abū Fuṭaīm	ابو فطيم
Madaīḥij, al-	المديحج
Mawlá Kháilah	مولى خيلة
Mawlá Dawīlah	مولى الدويلة
Munawwar, al-	المنور
Qadrī, al-	القدرى
Ṣāfiy, al-	الصافي
Ṣāfiy al-Jufrī, al-	الصافى الجفرى
Ṣāfiy Al-Saqqāf, al-	الصافى السقاف
Zāhir, al-	الزاهر

== See also ==
- Alavi (surname)
- Alids
