= Abu Bakr al-Aydarus =

Sufi saint

Abu Bakr al-ʿAydarūs, also known as Sayyid Abū Bakr al-ʿAdanī ibn ʿAbd Allāh al-ʿAydarūs (Arabic: أبو بكر العدني بن عبد الله العيدروس; 1447–1508) was a Hadhrami religious scholar of Sufism and a poet who wrote in vernacular style. Abu Bakr spent most of his adult life in Aden, where he was well respected for his societal contributions to the well-being of the city's residents. After his death in 1508, he was mourned by the city's residents, and was later venerated as the wali or "patron saint" of Aden.

== Biography ==
Abu Bakr was born in Tarim in the Hadhramawt in 1447. In his youth, Abu Bakr studied the teachings of al-Ghazali, and in his early adulthood, he was sent to Aden to undertake missionary duties there. Abu Bakr oversaw the construction of the city's mosque and its Sufi school, and later settled down in the city. Nevertheless, he made occasional return trips to his family in Tarim, many of whom relied on a monetary endowment funded by charitable traders in the region.

Abu Bakr was eventually made the mansab or religious leader of Aden. He was highly respected by the city's residents, who described him as a brilliant and kind man with an excellent sense of justice. Abu Bakr was also respected by members of the Adeni Jewish community, providing them refuge when they were harassed by desert bandits. Abu Bakr also travelled to Harar after settling in Aden, and introduced the Qadiri order to Ethiopia.

=== Introduction of coffee ===
At least three Arab texts, namely the Tarikh of an-Najm al-Ghazzi, the Jāmiʻ karamāt al-awlīyāʼ of Yūsuf ibn Ismāʻīl Nabhānī and Istifa' al-Safwa li-Tashyat al-Qahwa, mention Abu Bakr's role in the introduction of coffee to the Hadhramawt. According to the Tarikh of an-Najm al-Ghazzi, Abu Bakr became impressed with the strong stimulating effect derived from eating the berries of a coffee tree during his wanderings. He praised its effects, taking the coffee berries and introducing them to his disciples. The other two sources, Jāmiʻ karamāt al-awlīyāʼ and the Istifa' al-Safwa li-Tashyat al-Qahwa, mentioned Abu Bakr's fondness of coffee and accredited him with the introduction of coffee to South Arabia.

== Death and legacy ==
Abu Bakr died in 1508, although some sources suggested that he died in 1503. His death was greatly mourned by residents of Aden, who published obituaries commemorating his life; an account of Abu Bakr's birthplace, Tarim, was also published. His grave has since been visited by thousands of Muslim pilgrims every year who continue to pay their respects.

=== Aidarus Mosque ===
Several people alleged that Abu Bakr possessed mystical powers and claimed that they had met his spirit while sleeping; one legend mentioned a Sikh traveller who met Abu Bakr in his dream shortly after his demise. The Sikh, who was suffering from a stomachache, fell asleep beside his tomb. In his dream, Abu Bakr instructed the Sikh to bathe in a nearby pond and he quickly recovered. Following the ordeal, the grateful Sikh built a mosque over Abu Bakr's grave and shortly before returning to India, he gave a promise to the local residents that he would provide the doors for the newly constructed mosque. The Sikh met Abu Bakr again after his return to India, who narrated to Abu Bakr of his difficulty of bringing wood to Yemen for the construction of the mosque's doors. Abu Bakr provided instructions to the Sikh on the fate of the wooden logs, to which he duly followed and threw them into the sea. Residents at Sira later reported of receiving the wooden logs which the Sikh had thrown into the sea, and noted an inscription which stated the intended use of the wooden logs. The mosque later became the centre of Sufi learning in Aden, and several of his descendants took on the duty of the mosque's custodians. Renovations works were initiated during the 19th century and again in the 1990s, after the mosque suffered serious structural damage from the North Yemen Civil War.

== Descendants ==
Abu Bakr al-Adani had one son who was known as Ahmad al-Musawa, his line of male-descent went extinct, subsequently also ending the lineage of al-Adani's descendants.

== See also ==
- Ali al-Uraydi
- Sa'eed ibn Isa Al-Amoudi
- Muhammad al-Faqih al-Muqaddam
- 'Abdallah ibn 'Alawi al-Haddad
