= Habib Salih =

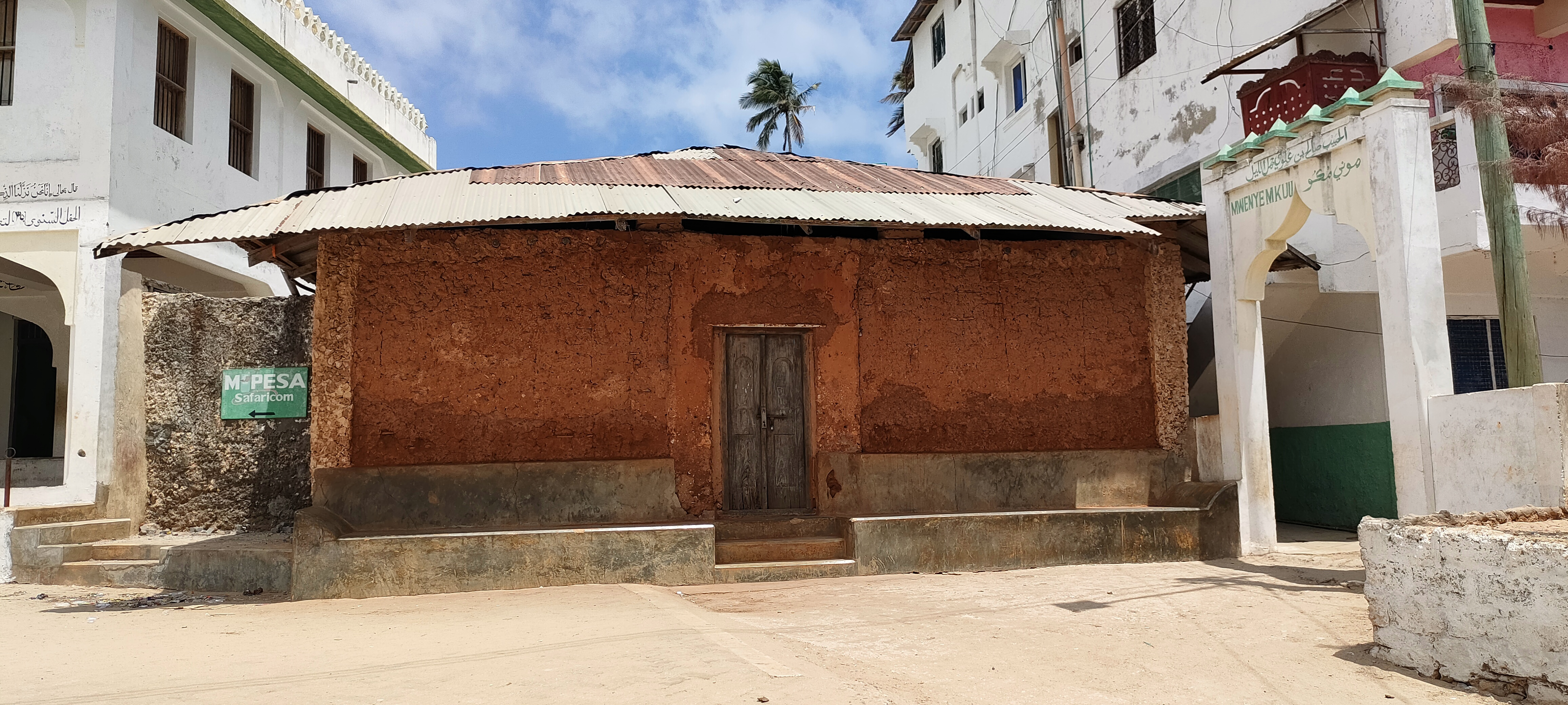
Habib Swaleh’s house in Lamu

Habib Swaleh (Arabic: حبيب صالح) or Salih bin Alawi Jamal al-Layl (Arabic: صالح بن علوي جمل الليل) (1853-1936) an Islamic scholar who was born in Comoros and then resided in Lamu, Kenya.

== Life ==
He initiated the annual Maulid Festival in Lamu, which became an annual event. attracting visitors from various countries. Habib Swaleh was also a herbalist who specialized in Islamic traditional medicine. He is the founder of Riyadha mosque lamu.

He died in 1935 C.E in Lamu.
