= Tarim district =

Coordinates: 16.0658°N 49.0228°E

Tarim District مديرية تريم
- District
- Interactive map of Tarim District
- Country: Yemen
- Governorate: Hadhramaut

Population (2021)
  - Total: 159,767
- Time zone: UTC+3 (Yemen Standard Time)

Tarim District (Arabic: مديرية تريم) is a district of the Hadhramaut Governorate, Yemen. As of 2021, the district had a population of 159,767 inhabitants, with Tarim as its biggest city.
