= 'Abdullah ibn 'Alawi al-Haddad =

Yemeni Sufi scholar (1634–1720)

Imam Mujaddid Abdullah ibn Alawi Al-Haddad
- عبد الله بن علوي الحداد
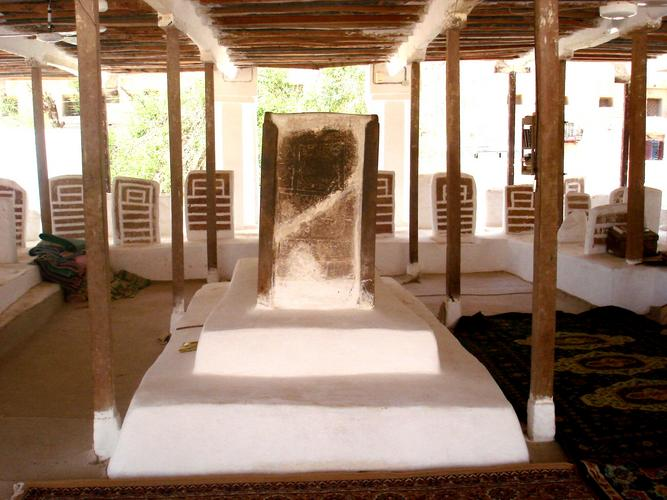
- The tomb of Abdallah al-Haddad
- Title: Habib

Personal life
- Born: Abd Allah; 30 July 1634 Tarim, Hadhramaut
- Died: 10 September 1720 (aged 86) Tarim
- Children: Zayn; Hasan; Salim; Muhammad; Alawi; Husayn
- Parents: Alawi bin Muhammad (father); Salma bint Aydarus (mother)
- Notable work(s): Wird Latif, The Book of Assistance, The Lives of Man, Knowledge and Wisdom
- Known for: Sufism
- Occupation: Islamic scholar and jurist Sufi

Religious life
- Religion: Sunni Islam
- Jurisprudence: Shafi'i
- Creed: Ash'ari

Senior posting
- Influenced by: al-Ghazali

'Abdullah ibn 'Alawi al-Haddad (Arabic: عبد الله ابن علوي الحدّاد, romanized: ʿAbd Allāh ibn ʿAlawī al-Ḥaddād, Arabic pronunciation: [ʕbd ɑllah ibn ʕlwij ɑl-ħadda:d]; born in 1634 CE) was a Yemeni Islamic scholar. He lived his entire life in the town of Tarim in Yemen's Valley of Hadhramawt and died there in 1720 CE (1132 Hijri). He was an adherent to the Ash'ari Sunni Creed of Faith (Aqidah), while in Islamic jurisprudence (Fiqh), he was a Sunni Muslim of Shafi'i school.

Despite being a major source of reference among the Sunni Muslims, especially belonging to the Shafi'i-Hadhrami school spread throughout Yemen and the Indian Ocean, only recently have his books began to receive attention and publication in the English-speaking world. Their appeal lies in the concise way in which the essential pillars of Islamic belief, practice, and spirituality have been streamlined and explained efficiently enough for the modern reader. Examples of such works are The Book of Assistance, The Lives of Man, and Knowledge and Wisdom.

== Early life ==
Abd Allah (or Abdullah) was born on Sunday night, 5th Safar, 1044 AH (1634 CE) in al-Subayr, a village on the outskirts of Tarim in Hadhramawt. His father was Alawi bin Muhammad al-Haddad, a pious man of taqwa, from the people of Allah. Imam al-Haddad's paternal grandmother, Salma, was also known to be a woman of gnosis and Sainthood. His mother was Salma bint Aydarus bin Ahmad al-Habshi. His maternal great-grandfather, Ahmad al-Habshi, met his father, before he was to meet his future wife, Abd Allah's mother and he said to Imam al-Haddad's father, "Your children are my children, and there is a blessing in them".

The first person of Ba 'Alawi sada to acquire the surname al-Haddad (The Ironsmith) was Imam al-Haddad's ancestor, Sayyid Ahmad bin Abu Bakr. The Sayyid, who lived in the ninth century of the Hijra, took to sitting at the ironsmith’s shop in Tarim much of the time, hence he was called Ahmad al-Haddad (Ahmad the Ironsmith).

The Imam was tall and fair skinned. Smallpox blinded him for life before the age of five. This does not seem to have affected his personality or scholarship, in memorizing the whole Qur'an or even his look, as no scars remained on his face. “In my childhood,” he testifies, “I was never treated like one who didn’t see, neither in walking nor in playing.” From a young age, he was trained as a religious scholar as he was given to very intense worship and spiritual struggle as a child. He also chose the ascetic path, "In the beginning, I spent a long period subsisting on coarse food and wearing rough clothes.”

Imam al-Haddad would perform recitation a quarter juz (portion) of the Quran practice alone in his youth, prior to the age of 17 in the desert canyons around Tarim. Sometimes he would do this with one of his friends. In Ramadan 1061 A.H (1650 C.E.) while he was still only 17, the Imam entered khalwa (spiritual seclusion), in a zawiyah of the Masjid al-Wujayrah mosque in Tarim. He also married in this same year. He would spend his time in khalwa (prayer) during the day and then leave to be with his wife at night, at the home of his wife’s family. At night, his servant would lead him to various mosques in Tarim where it is reported he would pray up to 700 Rakat (ritual prayer units) per night.

Among the nicknames of Imam al-Haddad was the axis of invitation and spiritual guidance (Al-Qutb At Dawati wal Irshaad). He was also known as the "blacksmith of hearts" (Haddad al-Quloob). A possible meaning for this would be that they would take a rusted or corroded piece of metal and transform it into a shiny well-formed piece of metal, making it like new.

== Education ==
Imam al-Haddad studied with many of the scholars of his time in Hadhramaut, one of them is his own father. Before he reached the age of 15, his father advised to memorize a book called al-Irshad, an extremely abridged work in Shafi'i fiqh, but later requested that he would prefer to study the book Bidayat al-Hidayah (Beginning of Guidance) instead of concentrating on jurisprudence. Amongst the foremost of his other teachers was al-Habib al-Qutb Umar bin Abd al-Rahman al-Attas. Imam Abd al-Rahman al-Attas is known to be the teacher that allowed him to develop some of his spiritual opening as a student. He also studied under several other Ulama of Ba 'Alawi sada, such as al-Habib Aqil bin Abd al-Rahman Al-Saqqaf, Al-Habib Al-’Allamah Abd al-Rahman bin Shaykh Aidid, Al-Habib Al-’Allamah Sahl bin Ahmad Bahsin Al-Hudayli Ba’alawi and the great scholar in Mecca, Al-Habib Muhammad bin Alawi Al-Saqqaf, and several other Ulama.

As a very young man when Imam al-Haddad would recite Surah Yaseen, he would start crying and be overcome with crying. It is believed that his spiritual opening was through Surah Yaseen. He studied Bidayat al-hidayah (Beginning of Guidance, By Imam Ghazali) under the guidance of a scholar, al-Faqih ba-Jubayr. He also studied Ihya' 'ulum al-din (Revival of Religious Sciences) by Imam al-Ghazali under the scholar.

Some of Imam al-Haddad‘s students were his sons, Hasan and Husayn al-Haddad, as well as al-Habib Ahmad bin Zayn al-Habshi. al-Habib Ahmad bin Zayn al-Habshi became Imam al-Haddad’s successor in leading the Sufism after his death.

== Works and teachings ==
Earning his livelihood from the plantations he owned, his life was devoted to teaching and writing. Imam al-Haddad began to teach shortly after he entered khalwa (seclusion). Among the books he taught was Awaarif al-Ma’arif which is a classical work in tasawwuf by Abu Hafs Umar al-Suhrawardi. He did this approximately for 11 years until 1072 A.H. (1661 C.E.). Even the Sultans of his day received letters of admonition and counsel from him. He spent most of his life in Hadhramawt where he taught Islamic jurisprudence and classical Sufism according to the Ba 'Alawiyya Sufi order (tariqa).

His works revolve around the attainment of certainty (yaqin), the degree of unshakeable faith in God and Muhammad. They are void of investigative or dogmatic debates. Furthermore, he does not bring up legal rulings (ahkam fiqhiyya), which would necessitate that his readership be limited to the adherents of his school of law (Shafi'i). Thus, his works are very well suited, if not purposely designed, for mass readership. His writings are brief because he judged that coming generations would not have time to read large volumes.

"Yaqin" is attained by proper practice of the "Sunnah" in fulfilling obligatory worships and avoiding prohibitions along with sincerity and truthfulness to God. There should be no barriers between the outward forms, the inward essence, and practical applicability of the Islamic teachings. Thus, whoever has knowledge, according to Imam al-Haddad, must teach it to those who need it.

He authored several books in the area of Sufism as well as books of dhikr such as the Ratib al-Haddad (Arabic: راتب الحداد, Known as the “Gadat” in the local dialect) and Wird al-Lateef (Arabic: الورد اللطيف). He also authored books such as a ten-volume series of his short treatises, his volume of poetry, a compilation of his sayings, Risaalat al-Mu`awanah (The Book of Assistance), an-Nasaih al-Diniyyah wal-Wasaya al-Imaniyyah (Religious Counsels and Faith-based Advices).

As a Sayyid, his sanctity and direct experience of God are clearly reflected in his writings, which include several books, a collection of Sufi letters, and a volume of mystical poetry.

== Later life ==
Imam al-Haddad lived during Islam’s "Period of Decline", in which its forces of might and beauty seem to have become exhausted. During his life, the British were already accustomed to trade in Yemen, and the Portuguese had captured the island of Socotra, 350 km off the coast. Muslim expansion had virtually come to a halt. Furthermore, his region of Hadramawt witnessed a simply ruinous period during his life. When Imam al-Haddad was twenty-five, Hadhramawt was conquered by the Qasimi Zaydis of Upper Yemen. The Hadhramis regained their freedom in 1715 CE; the Imam was eighty-one years of age.

== Death ==
Imam al-Haddad died in his home in al-Hawi, Tarim on Monday night 7th or 8th Dhu al-Qadah, 1132 AH (1720 C.E.) and buried at Zanbal cemetery in Tarim. His grave is one of the main destinations many people visited when they do a religious tour to Hadhramaut.

Imam al-Haddad was survived by six sons. His first son was Zayn, the second son, Hasan, died in Tarim in 1188 AH, the third one was Salim, whose descendants live in Basra, the fourth one was Muhammad, whose descendants are in Tarim. The fifth, Alawi, died in Mecca in 1153 AH and his descendants live in Tarim. The last one, Husayn, died in Tarim in 1136 AH. His descendants live in Gujarat.

== Sources ==
Badawî, Mostafâ (2005). Sufi Sage of Arabia: Imām ʻAbdallāh Al-Ḥaddād (illustrated ed.). Fons Vitae. ISBN 978-1-887752657.
