= Seiyun =

City in Yemen

Seiyun سَيْئُوْن Say'un
- City
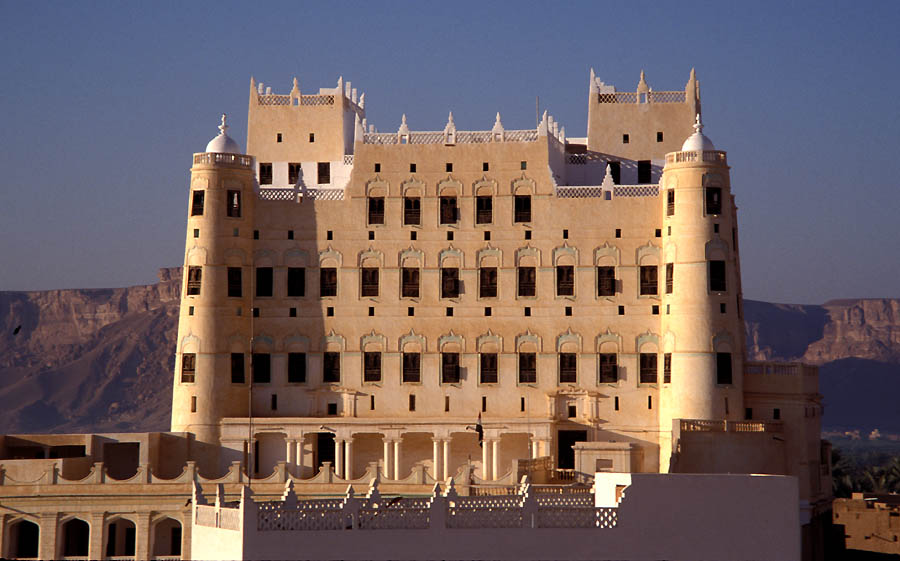
- The Sultan Al Kathiri Palace, the most prominent landmark of Seiyun.

- Location in Yemen
- Coordinates: 15°58′N 48°47′E
- Country: Yemen
- Federal Region: Hadhramaut
- Governorate: Hadhramaut
- District: Seiyun

Population (2015)
  - Total: 135,000
- Time zone: UTC+3 (Yemen Standard Time)

Seiyun (Note: Arabic: سَيْئُوْن, romanized: Sayʾūn Hadhrami pronunciation: [seːˈwuːn], Literary Arabic: [sæjˈʔuːn]) is a city in Hadhramaut Governorate of Yemen. It is located in the middle of the Hadhramaut Valley, about 360 km (220 miles) from Mukalla, the capital of Mukalla District and the largest city in the area, via western route. It is 12 km (7.5 miles) from Shibam and 35 km (22 miles) from Tarim, the other large cities in the valley.

The city is the largest area of Hadhramaut valley. Prominent villages surrounding the city include Madurah, Mérida, Burr, Hazkir, and Houta Sultana.

It is served by Seiyun Airport. It is also well known for the Seiyun Palace of the Sultan of Kathiri built in the 1920s with mud and stones. It oversees the marketplace for merchants coming from outside.

== Name ==
It is said that the origin of the city was a resting point for travellers. There was a café with a woman named Seiyun there, and the area was named after her in her honor.

== History ==
Seiyun is first mentioned in the beginning of the 4th century, during the reign of King Dhamar who ruled the area around Hadhramaut Valley at the time and was known for destroying 60,000 columns in the area. Destruction of the columns confirms that the Hadhramaut region was undergoing an economic prosperity owing to the spread of grape cultivation in large areas under the climatic conditions different from the current ones.

Seiyun during the Islamic period emerged as a village in the era of the Rashidun Caliphate. It was administratively part of the city of Tarim. This was the case during the Umayyad period as well. In 708, it became administratively affiliated with the city of Shibam. The son of Haritha led the revolution in 1179 but it gained its autonomy only in the year 1501 when it became the capital of the valley in the era of Badr Abu Tuwairq (1501-1556), where an administrative unit consisting of a sultanate that extended from Ain Ba to the west of the city of Dhofar was founded. In the 18th-century, Yafa conquered the cities of Hadhramaut and took over many parts of Seiyun, where the state was established. In 1852, it became the capital of the State of Kathiri (Aden-Kathiri) which was within the British Aden Protectorate (1869 - 1963). Its fortified fortress, the Sultan's Palace, was the seat of Sultan al-Kathiri. Postage stamps from the Sultanate were sometimes inscribed "Kathiri State of Seiyun." After the independence from British colonialism, Seiyun became the capital of the Southern district in the fifth province of Hadhramaut.

== Geography ==
Sayun District covers an area of approximately 804 square kilometers. It is located in the central part of Hadramaut Governorate and Wadi Hadramaut, at a latitude of 15.57° North and a longitude of 48.46° East. It is bordered by the districts of Tarim and Sah, to the south, Tarim and Al-Quf to the north, Tarim to the east, and Shibam to the west. Sayun is situated 320 kilometers from the governorate's capital, Al Mukalla.

The terrain consists of a relatively flat plain, part of the Wadi Hadramaut, surrounded by mountain ranges on the northern and southern sides, leading to the northern and southern plateaus. Several sub-valleys of Wadi Hadramaut pass through these mountain ranges, including Wadi Shuhuh, Wadi Jathmah, and Wadi Bin Salman in Tarim, and Wadi Mudar in Bur.

== Climate ==
The climate is tropical with a high temperature in the summer (26 - 42 °C) and a mild temperature in the winter (6 - 28 °C). Rain is rare and usually falls from mid-spring until autumn.

== Demographics ==
According to the 2004 census projections, the population of Sayun District was approximately 111,728 people. The population density was estimated at around 139 people per square kilometer. The residential areas are concentrated in the city and its suburbs, as well as in areas like Taribah, Taris, Al-Gharfah, Wadi Bur, and Mudawwarah. Urban areas constitute approximately 47.4% of the population, while rural areas constitute 52.6%. Sayun District accounts for 10.9% of the total population of the governorate and 14.3% of the population in Wadi Hadramaut and the Desert.

== Architecture ==
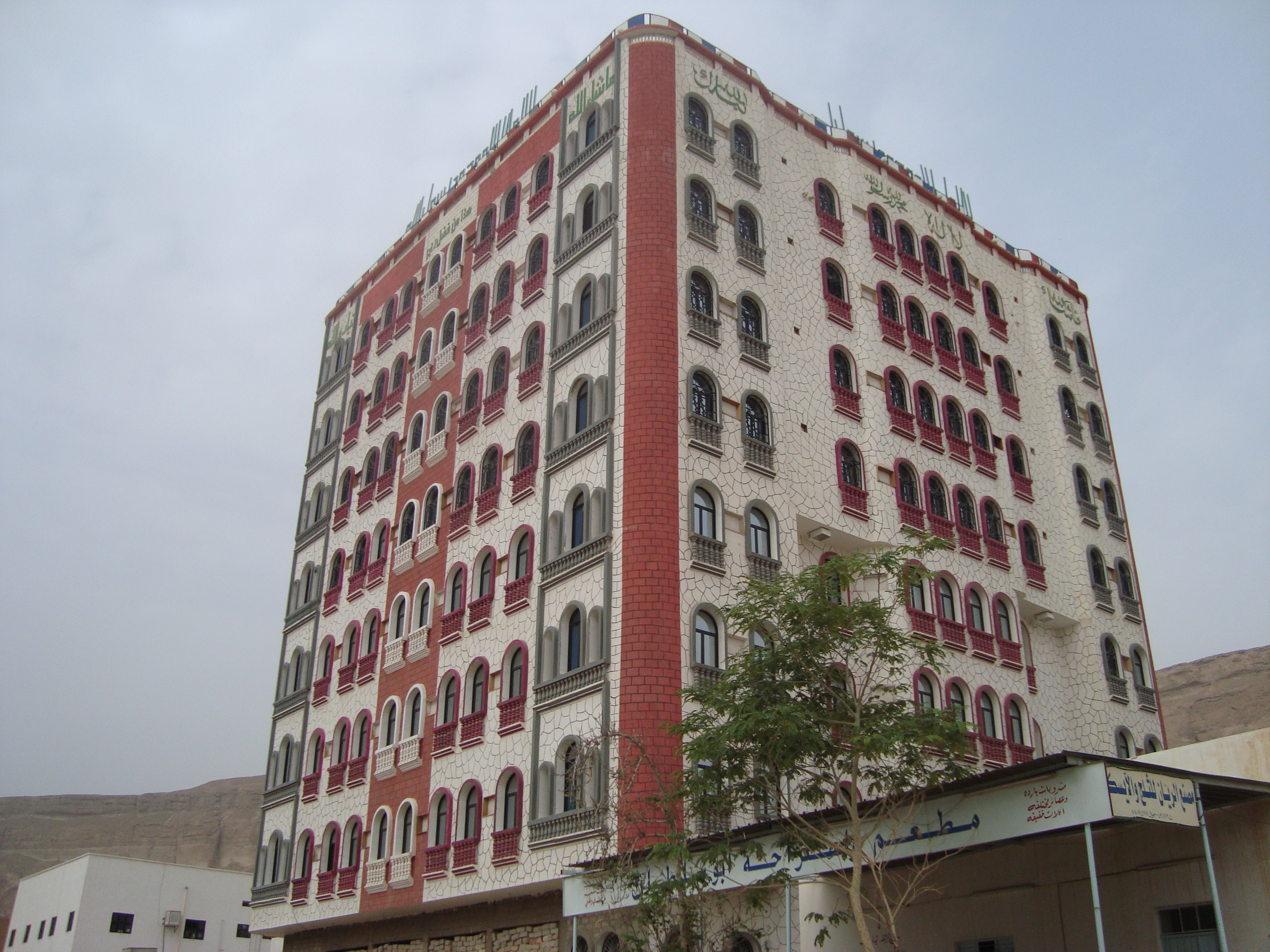
A building in Seiyun

As for its architectural development, it can be summarized as follows: In the 7th century AH, it was a small village located within the district of Shaharah - Al-Sahil. It then developed to include other buildings, and a wall was built around it during the reign of Sultan Badr Abi Tuwairq in the year 922 AH. This wall remained until the year 1347 AH.

Regarding the buildings, in the 7th century AH, they were confined to Shaharah - Al-Sahil until the 8th century AH. The cemetery of the city was established in the 7th century outside the city in the eastern direction. Taha ibn Umar later acquired a piece of land far from the city and built a mosque (Taha Mosque), but there were no other architectural features. In the 10th century AH, the urbanization expanded due to its status as the capital of the Kathiri Sultanate during the reign of Sultan Badr Abi Tuwairq (922-977 AH). In the year 1120 AH, Ali ibn Abdullah Al-Sqaf obtained a piece of desert land in the tribal district and built a mosque on it. The urbanization continued in the 14th century when Abu Bakr bin Salim Al-Saban acquired a piece of desert land in Wadi Jatham and built a mosque on it. The Seiyun Mosque was built in the 9th century AH to accommodate this development. In the 14th century, the mosque was rebuilt as a Friday mosque, and there are four mosques in Seiyun where Friday prayers are held: Al-Jami Mosque, Taha Mosque, Al-Qarn Mosque, and Basalam Mosque. The oldest of them is the Al-Jami Mosque in Seiyun, which was the only mosque where Friday prayers were held.

== City Landmarks ==
There are many ancient landmarks in Seiyun, the most prominent of which are:

=== Seiyun Museum Palace ===
The Kathiri Palace, also known as the "Dawil Palace," is located in the center of Seiyun, making it one of the most prominent landmarks in the city and all of Hadhramaut. It is considered one of the most magnificent mud-brick architectural masterpieces.

This palace was initially established as the residence of the Sultan during the reign of Sultan Badr bin Abdullah bin Jafar Al Kathiri, famously known as "Abu Tuwairq" (922-977 AH). This indicates that the palace existed before the reign of Sultan Abu Tuwairq, who made it his official residence and added a mosque to it. He also renovated the palace and expanded it. The Sultan Abu Tuwairq, who emerged during a period of bloody conflicts that engulfed most of the territories of Hadhramaut, managed to occupy most of these territories, including Shahr.

In the year 1125 AH, Omar bin Jafar Al Kathiri renewed the construction of the palace. In 1272 AH, Ghalib bin Muhsin Al Kathiri arrived in Seiyun and made it the capital of his rule. He used the Dawil Palace as his ruling headquarters and renovated it. Later, his son Mansour bin Ghalib bin Muhsin Al Kathiri continued the construction of the palace in the period between 1355-1357 AH, adding adornments and making expansions, including the construction of the Al-Aqra, which is the entrance leading to the palace, and building a large hall in the façade and its surroundings. The palace remains in the same state until now.

Recently, part of the palace has been utilized as a museum, which was inaugurated in 1983. The museum houses ancient artifacts collected from various sites in Wadi Hadhramaut, including those excavated from the Ribat site. It also features sections dedicated to folk heritage and historical documents, including those related to the Kathiri Sultanate when Seiyun served as its capital. Additionally, part of the palace has been designated as an administration office for the Ministry of Culture. A theater was also built on the southeast side of the palace in 1982, accommodating over 5000 spectators.

=== Seiyun Olympic Stadium ===
Seiyun Olympic Stadium is one of the largest stadiums in Yemen and the largest in Hadhramaut, capable of accommodating over 35,000 spectators.

=== Qarat Al-Ar ===
Qarat Al-Ar houses an ancient fortress mentioned in the year 616 AH when it was cited by historians as the place where Sultan Abdullah bin Rashid Al Qahtani was imprisoned and killed. Later, the fortress was renewed in 855 AH during the reign of Sultan Badr bin Abdullah bin Ali Al Kathiri, who used it as a prison for sultans.

=== Hisn Al-Fals ===
Hisn Al-Fals is an ancient fortress mentioned initially by historians in the year 603 AH. Its age is estimated to be around 400 years, as it was built during the reign of Sultan Badr Bintuwaireq or the period that followed. It is situated on a hill in the center of Al-Qarn neighborhood in Seiyun and served as an advanced military fortress, with its edges meeting the extensions of the historical wall of Seiyun.

== See also ==
- Kathiri State of Seiyun in Hadhramaut
