= Seiyun district =

Coordinates: 15.9831°N 48.8314°E

Sayun District مديرية سيئون
- District
- Interactive map of Sayun District
- Country: Yemen
- Governorate: Hadhramaut

Population (2021)
  - Total: 161,538
- Time zone: UTC+3 (Yemen Standard Time)

Sayun District is a district of the Hadhramaut Governorate, Yemen. As of 2003, the district had a population of 102,409 inhabitants.

== Geography ==
Sayun District is about 804 square kilometers wide. The district is located in the central part of Hadhramaut and Wadi Hadhramaut. It is bordered to the south by Tarim and Sah Districts, and to the west by Shibam District. Siyoun District is about 320 kilometers from the provincial capital Mukalla. As for the terrain, the district consists of a relatively flat surface that forms a part of Wadi Hadhramaut surrounded by mountain ranges from the northern and southern sides leading to the northern and southern plateaus. These mountain ranges also penetrate several sub-valleys of Hadhramaut Valley, Wadi Bin Salman in Batarab and the northern part of Wadi Madr Bbour.

== Demographics ==
As of 2021, the district had a population of 161,538 inhabitants. The population centers are concentrated in the city and its suburbs, and urban ratio is 47.4% and rural areas consists 52.6%. In general, the population of the district is 10.9% of the total population of the governorate and 14.3% of the population of the whole valley and the desert.
