= Tarim, Yemen =

Tarim تَرِيْم
- Town
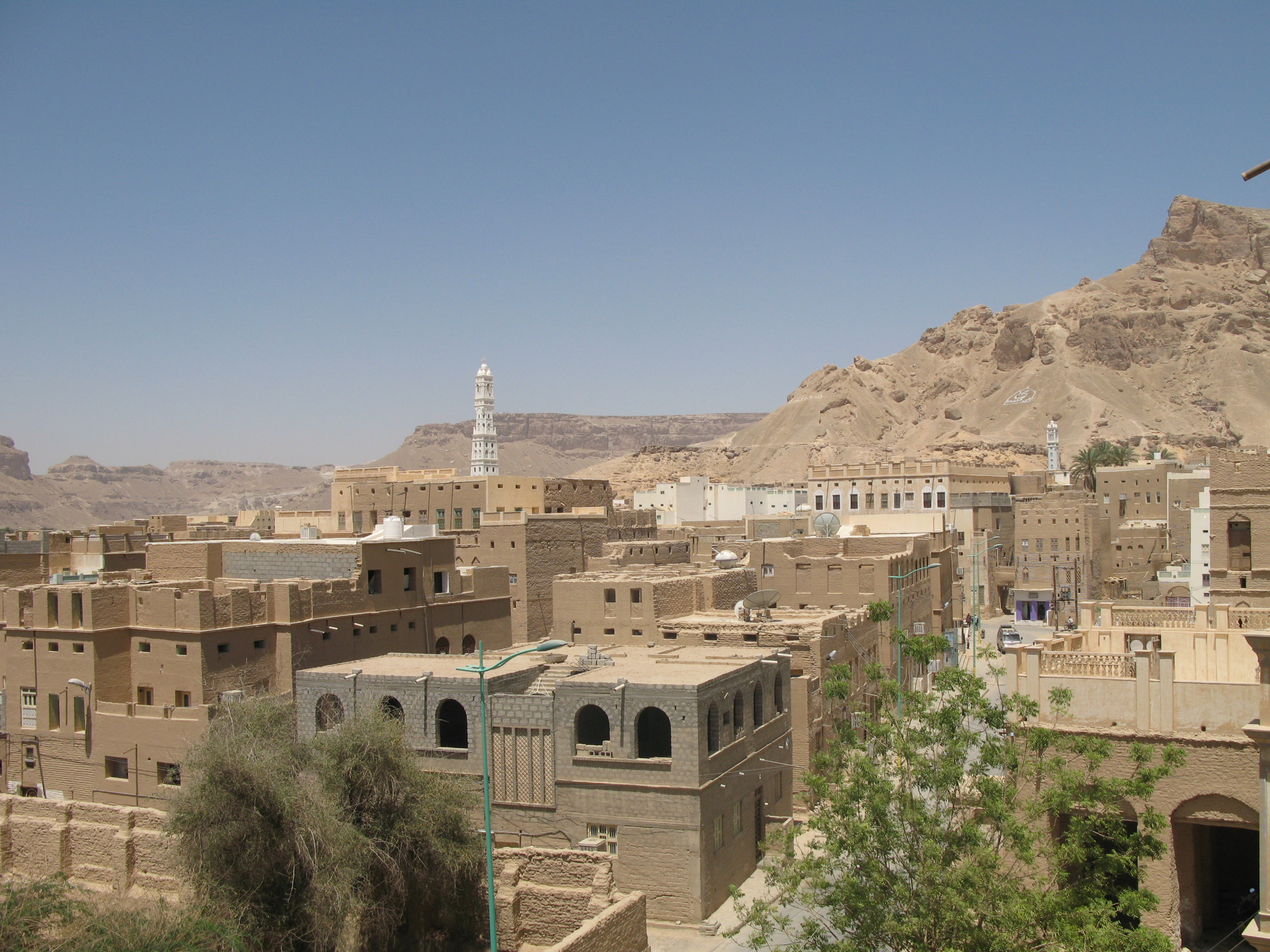
- Overview

- Location in Yemen Tarim (Middle East) Tarim (Asia)
- Coordinates: 16°03′N 49°0′E
- Country: Yemen
- Governorate: Hadhramaut
- District: Tarim

Population (2012)
  - Total: 58,523
- Time zone: UTC+3 (South Arabia Standard Time)

Tarim (Arabic: تَرِيْم, romanized: Tarīm) is a historic town situated in Hadhramaut, Yemen. It is widely acknowledged as the theological, juridical, and academic center of Wadi Hadhramaut. An important center of Islamic learning, it is estimated to contain the highest concentration of descendants of the Islamic Prophet Muhammad known as the Sayyids anywhere in the world. The city is distinguished for producing numerous Islamic scholars, including Imam al-Haddad. Additionally, Tarim is also home to Dar al-Mustafa, a well-known educational institution for the study of traditional Islamic Sciences.

== History ==
=== 7th–8th centuries ===
In 625, Badhan, the Persian Governor of Sanaa accepted Islam and the rest of the country soon followed. Arab historians agree that Tarim was established in the fourth century of Hijra. The citizens of Tarim converted to Islam in the early days of Islam when the delegation of Hadhramaut met the Islamic Prophet Muhammad in Medina in the tenth year of Hijra (631). Tarim is often referred to as Al-Siddiqi City, in honor of Abu-Bakr al-Siddiq, the first caliph of Sunni Islam (r. 632–634). Abu Bakr prayed that Allah would increase Tarim's scholars and water, as its citizens stood with him during the Ridda wars after the Prophet's death (632–633). A battle occurred in Al-Nujir Fortress, in which many of the Prophet's companions (Sahabah) were injured and taken to Tarim for treatment. Some companions, however, were buried in the cemetery of Zambal.

=== British and the Qu'aiti Dynasty: 1882–1967 ===
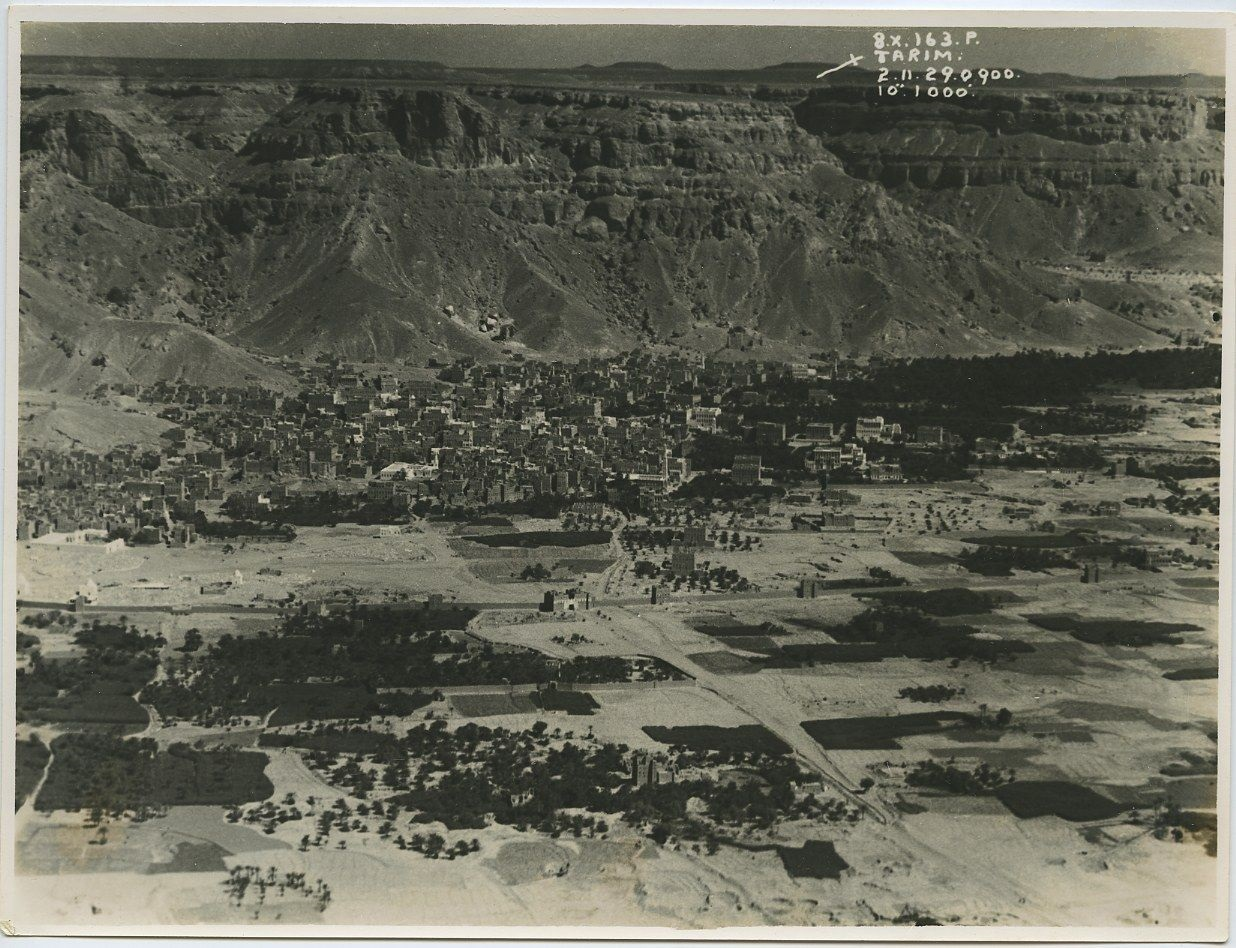
Tarim in 1929

In 1809, disaster struck Hadhramaut following a Wahhabi invasion. Valuable books and documents from the Robat at Tarim were destroyed by fire or by dumping in wells. While the Wahhabi occupation was short-lived, it ravaged the economy. As a result, emigration increased, the top destination being Hyderabad (India), where the Nizam employed a considerable army. Here, a Yemeni soldier named Umar bin Awadh al Qu'aiti rose to the rank of Jemadar and amassed a fortune. Umar's influence enabled him to create the Quaiti dynasty in the late 19th century. Having secured all valuable land excluding the areas around Saiyun and Tarim, the Qu'aitis signed a treaty with the British in 1888, and created a unified sultanate in 1902 that became part of the Aden Protectorate.

=== Ingrams' Peace ===
Despite establishing a regionally advanced administration, by the 1930s the Qu'aiti Sultan Saleh bin Ghalib (r. 1936–1956) was facing stiff pressure to modernize – a task for which he seriously lacked resources. These demands were largely initiated by returning Yemeni emigrants, such as the Kaf Sayyids of Tarim. The family of Al-Kaf had made their fortune in Singapore, and wished to spend some of their wealth improving living conditions at home. Led by Sayyid Abu Bakr al-Kaf bin Sheikh, they built a motor road from Tarim to Shihr – hoping to use it to import goods into Hadhramaut, but were frustrated by opposition from the camel-owning tribes who had a transport monopoly between the coast and the interior.

In February 1937, a peace between the Qu'aiti and Kathiri sultanates, totally unprecedented in the history of that region, was brought about essentially by the efforts of two men: Sayyid Abu Bakr al-Kaf and Harold Ingrams, the first political officer in Hadhramaut. Sayyid Abu Bakr used his personal wealth to finance this peace, which was known universally thereafter as "Ingrams Peace." This brought some stability, permitting introduction of administrative, educational and development measures. Tarim remained under Kathiri rule. However, Tarim, alongside the neighboring settlement of Al Ghuraf, were pockets of Kathiri territory in the country of the Tamim. The Tamim, a subset of the larger Bani Dhanna tribe, occupied the land in between Tarim and Seiyoun and owed political allegiance to the Qu'aiti Sultanate.

=== Modern era: 1967-present ===
In November 1967, the British withdrew from South Yemen in the face of mass riots and an increasingly deadly insurgency. Their arch-enemies, the National Liberation Front, which was dominated by Marxists, seized power, and Tarim, with the rest of South Yemen, came under communist rule. The Aden Protectorate became an independent Communist state, the People's Democratic Republic of Yemen (PDRY). Hadhramaut, despite being part of the communist-aligned PDRY continued to live to a great extent on remittances from abroad. In 1990, South and North Yemen were unified. The town has remained unaffected during the Yemeni Civil War.

== Culture ==
Hadhramaut is considered the most religious part of Yemen. It is a province in which the mixture of tribal and Islamic traditions determines the social life of its inhabitants. Apart from urban settlements, Hadhramaut is still tribalised, although tribal bonds are no longer as powerful as they once were. Hadhramis live in densely built towns centered on traditional watering stations along the wadis. Hadhramis harvest crops of wheat, millet, tend date palm and coconut groves, and grow some coffee. On the plateau Bedouins tend sheep and goats. The Sayyid aristocracy, descended from Islamic prophet Muhammad, traditionally educated and strict in Islamic observance, are highly respected in both religious and secular affairs. Zaydism is largely confined to the Yemeni mountains, where Hashid and Bakil are the dominant tribes. The rest of Yemen primarily adheres to the Shafi'i school of Islamic jurisprudence. Although Zaydis are Shias and Shafi'is are Sunnis, the practical religious differences are generally minor, and each will freely worship in the others' mosques, if their own is not convenient.

=== Tribal groups ===
Nearly all Yemeni tribes are of Himyari origin. Exceptions are mainly of Kindi stock, originating from an invasion from the north in the 6th century. Kindah are credited with the final destruction of Shabwa when they arrived, but they subsequently settled among and intermarried with Himyaris. The incidence of straight rather than curly hair often denotes Kindi blood and some Kindi are bigger physically than most Himyaris. Kindi tribes include the Seiar, Al Doghar (Wadi Hajr), the Ja'ada (Wadi Amd), and one of the sections of the Deyyin (on the plateau south of Amd). Living among the tribes, but a little different, are the Mashaikh. Unlike the tribes, they did not raid nor were they raided. They also wore a different type of jambiya, more designed for domestic use than aggression. Al Buraik still supply the bulk of the population of the Shabwa area. Most are settled but some are nomads grazing with the Kurab. Other Mashaikh are dotted around the hills and valleys. The most important are Al Amoodi of Budha, many being successful traders throughout the Middle East. Most tribesmen and Mashaikh are farmers, those in the mountains and the plateau almost entirely so. Further east or north, however, there is less rainfall and more nomadic people. The Manahil are almost entirely nomadic, except for those absorbed into modern life, and the Hamum and the Mahra are mostly nomadic. On the fringes of the Rub' al Khali, the people continue to graze where they can, although a surprising number of Seiar and Awamr farm on the ill-watered plateau north of the Hadhramaut.

== Geography ==
The Hadhramaut Valley is a large region in southern Yemen spanning approximately 90,000 square kilometres (35,000 square miles). It consists of a narrow, arid coastal plain bounded by the steep escarpment of a broad plateau averaging around 1,400 m (0.87 miles) of altitude, with a sparse network of deeply sunk wadis (seasonal watercourses). Although the southern edge of Hadhramaut borders the Arabian Sea, Tarim is located around 180 km (110 miles) inland from the coast and 35 kilometres (22 miles) north-east of Seiyun. The region is characterized by rocky plateaus that reach elevations of around 900 m (3,000 ft), and are separated by numerous valleys. The closest airport to Tarim is located approximately 30 kilometres (19 miles) away, in the city of Seiyun. The only international flights directly to Seiyun originate in Jeddah (Saudi Arabia, and Dubai and Abu Dhabi in the United Arab Emirates. Otherwise, travelers can fly to the capital city of Sanaa. Then one can either take another flight from Sanaa to Seiyun, or travel by bus or car to Tarim from Sanaa. The distance from Sanaa to Tarim is approximately 640 km (400 miles), and driving time ranges from six to eight hours.

=== Climate ===
Tarim has a hot desert climate (Köppen climate classification BWh). The city receives very little precipitation. A few times throughout the year, however, Tarim experiences heavy rainfall resulting in significant flooding.

Climate data for Tarim
Month	Jan	Feb	Mar	Apr	May	Jun	Jul	Aug	Sep	Oct	Nov	Dec	Year
Mean daily maximum °C (°F)	24.1 (75.4)	25.4 (77.7)	27.7 (81.9)	29.7 (85.5)	32.1 (89.8)	33.6 (92.5)	32.6 (90.7)	32.0 (89.6)	31.0 (87.8)	29.3 (84.7)	27.0 (80.6)	25.4 (77.7)	29.2 (84.5)
Daily mean °C (°F)	18.9 (66.0)	20.1 (68.2)	22.5 (72.5)	24.5 (76.1)	27.1 (80.8)	28.3 (82.9)	27.7 (81.9)	27.2 (81.0)	26.3 (79.3)	23.6 (74.5)	21.1 (70.0)	20.0 (68.0)	23.9 (75.1)
Mean daily minimum °C (°F)	13.7 (56.7)	14.9 (58.8)	17.3 (63.1)	19.4 (66.9)	22.1 (71.8)	23.1 (73.6)	22.8 (73.0)	22.4 (72.3)	21.7 (71.1)	18.0 (64.4)	15.3 (59.5)	14.6 (58.3)	18.8 (65.8)
Average precipitation mm (inches)	10 (0.4)	6 (0.2)	17 (0.7)	11 (0.4)	3 (0.1)	0 (0)	2 (0.1)	3 (0.1)	0 (0)	0 (0)	6 (0.2)	9 (0.4)	67 (2.6)
Source: Climate-Data.org

== Architecture ==
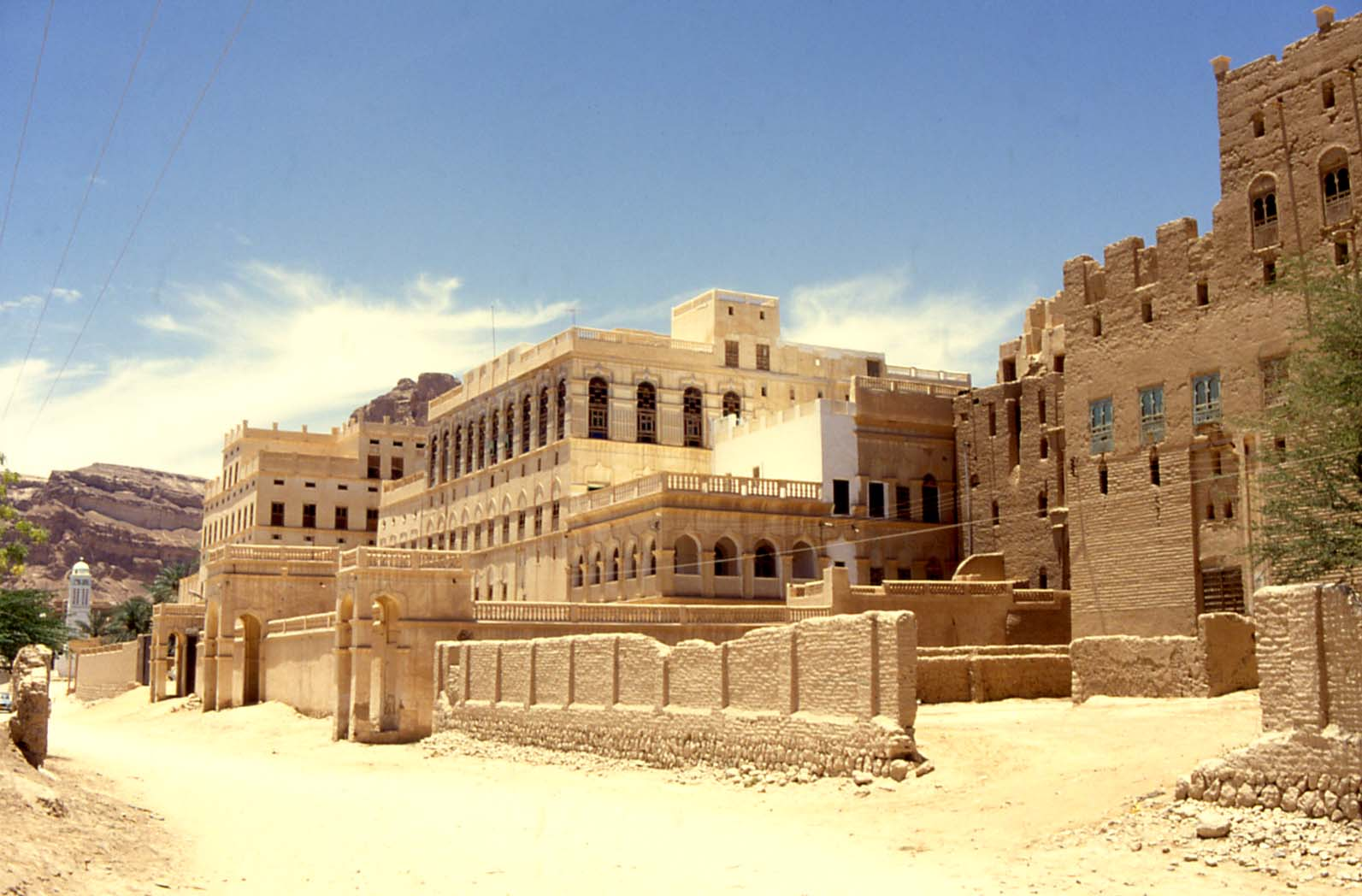
Street view

Geographically and socially varied, Tarim's diversity can be traced through the cultural interactions and hybrid architectural fabrics of various regions. Foreign styles and ornamental features entered Yemen as typological and aesthetic changes. In this way Tarimi architectural history represents a dialogue between cultures both within and outside of the modern nation.

=== Mosques and libraries ===
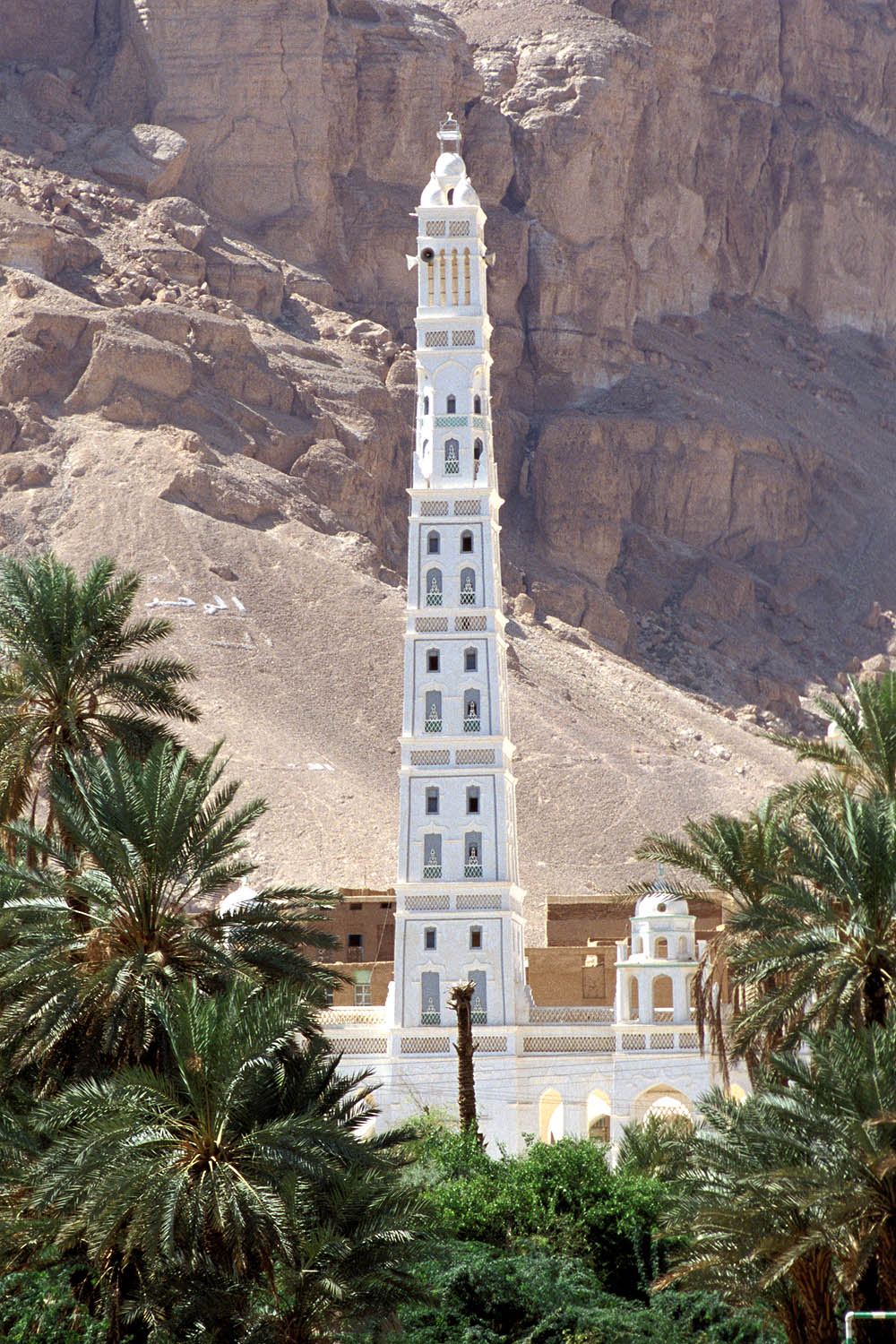
The minaret of Al-Muhdhar Mosque at Tarim is about 53 metres (174 feet) high. It is thus recognized to be the highest in South Arabia, and one of the tallest earth structures in the world.

It is estimated that Tarim contains up to 365 masājid (mosques); one, the Sirjis' Mosque, dates back to the seventh century. From the 17th to the 19th century, these mosques played a decisive role on the influence of Islamic scholarship in the area. Tarim's Al-Muhdhar Mosque is crowned by a mud minaret measuring approximately 53 metres (174 feet), the highest in Hadhramaut and Yemen. The minaret was designed by the local poets Abu Bakr bin Shihab and Alawi Al-Mash-hūr. Completed in 1914, Al-Muhdar Mosque is named in honor of Omar Al-Muhdar, a Muslim leader who lived in the city during the 15th century.

Tarim also features the massive Al-Kaf Library which is attached to Al-Jame'a Mosque and houses more than 5,000 manuscripts from the region covering religion, the thoughts of the Prophets, Islamic law, Sufism, medicine, astronomy, agriculture, biographies, history, mathematics, philosophy, logic, and the eight volumes of Abū Muhammad al-Hasan al-Hamdānī's Al-Iklil (The Crown). Many go back hundreds of years and often contain vibrantly colored illustration. Between 300 and 400 manuscripts are believed to be unique in the Islamic world, according to the scholar Abd al-Qader Sabban. What distinguishes these manuscripts is that the majority belong to Yemeni authors and editors who resided in the Wadi Hadhramaut area. Nevertheless, there are others that belonged to scholars from Morocco, Khurasan, and other Muslim regions. In 1996, estimates for the annual number of visitors to Al-Kaf Library exceeded 4,780 individuals.

=== Palaces ===
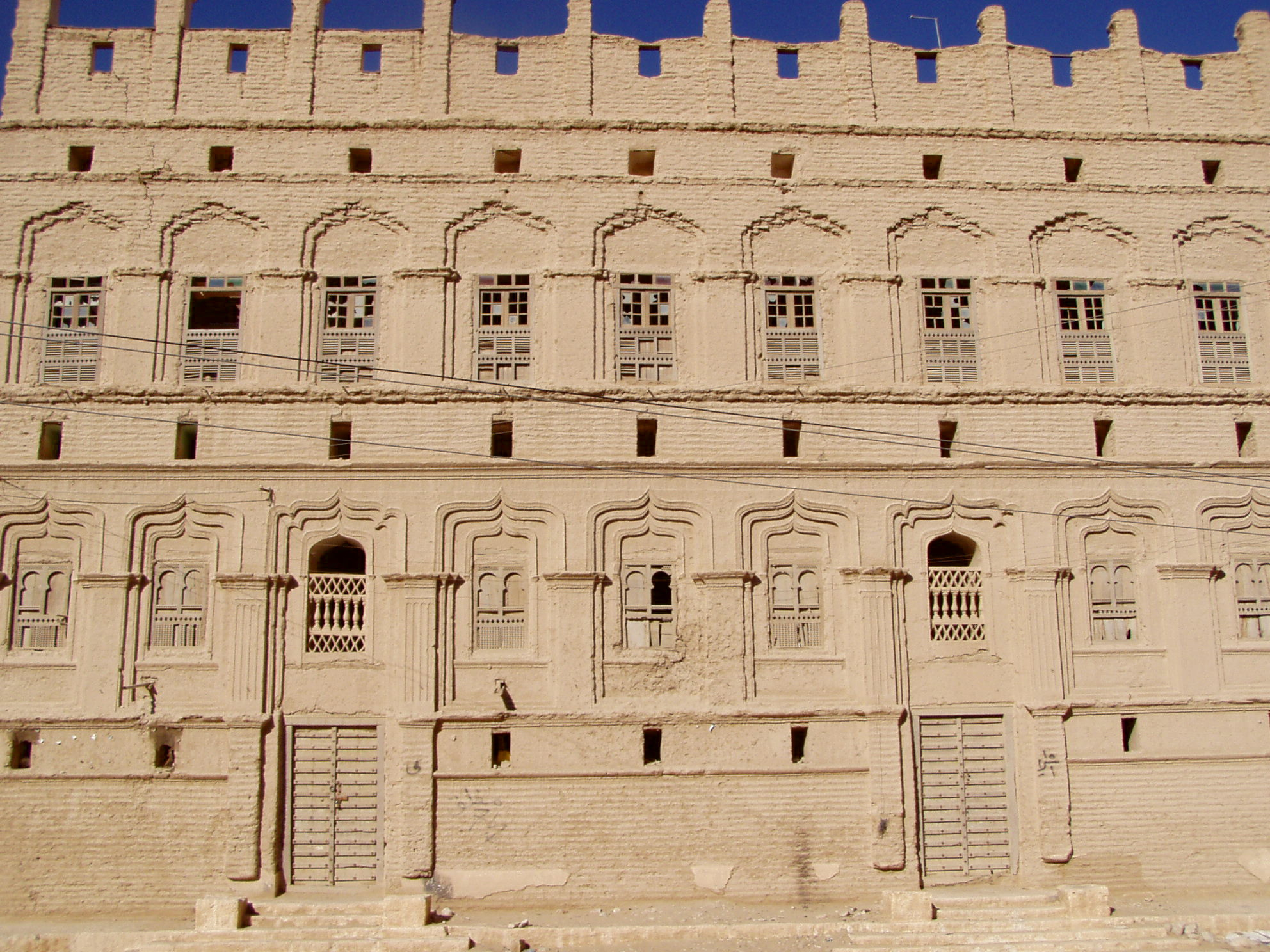
View of Qasr al-'Ishshah

Tarim is famous for its innumerable palaces – a collection of approximately thirty mansions constructed between the 1870s and 1930s. During the late 19th and early 20th centuries, Hadhramaut's merchant families grew rich from trade and investments abroad. The family of Al-Kaf was considered the most influential. Many members of the family were respected religious scholars. At the same time, they were among the regions first Westernizing elite and contributed to public works projects in the name of modernization. Their palaces remain as testament to both their affluence and the complex identity of the modernizing elite of the colonial period. Palaces financed by Al-Kafs and other families were executed in the stylistic idioms they encountered in British India and Southeast Asia. Consequently, the palaces include examples of Mughal, British Colonial, Art Nouveau, Deco, Rococo, Neo-Classical, and Modernist styles unparalleled in Yemen. While these foreign decorative styles were incorporated into the Tarimi architectural idiom, traditional Hadhrami construction techniques based on the thousand-year-old traditions of unfired mud brick and lime plasters served as the primary methods for executing these buildings.

== Education ==
=== Rabat Tarim ===
Rabat Tarim is an educational institution teaching Islamic and Arabic sciences. In 1886, a group of Tarimi notables decided to build a religious institution for foreign and domestic students in Tarim, and accommodate foreign students. Those notables were Mohammed bin Salem Assri, Ahmed bin Omar al-Shatri, Abdul-Qader bin Ahmed al-Haddad, Ahmed bin Abdul-Rahman al-Junied and Mohammed bin Omar Arfan. Rubat Tarim was inaugurated on 2 October 1887. Supervision was ascribed to the mufti of Hadhramaut, Abdul-Rahman Bin Mohammed Al-Meshhūr. Early teachers in Rubat Tarim were Alwi bin Abdul-Rahman bin Abibakr al-Meshhūr, Hussein bin Mohammed al-Kaf, Ahmed bin Abdullah al-Bekri al-Khateeb, Hassan bin Alwi bin Shihab, Abu Bakr bin Ahmed bin Abdullah al-Bekri al-Khatīb and Mohammed bin Ahmed al-Khatīb. They were delegated to teach when Abdullah bin Omar al-Shatri was appointed upon returning from Mecca, where he had studied for four years. Al-Shatri taught at Rubat Tarim voluntarily until his death in 1942. He was succeeded by his sons (Mohammed, Abu Bakr, Hasan and Salem). In 1979, Rubat Tarim was closed by the PDRY. It reopened after the unification of Yemen in 1991 and continues to function.

According to statistics from 2007, the number of scholars graduating from Rubat Tarim has reached over 13,000. Foreign students currently total about 300, with 1,500 Yemeni students. Many graduates later traveled abroad to propagate Islam and establish religious institutions. Several became authors and publishers in the Tradition, Interpretation of Quran and other branches of religious knowledge. The most famous scholar among them was probably Abdul Rahman Al-Mash-hūr.

=== Other ===
Dar al-Zahra is a sister institute of Dar al-Mustafa which offers education for Muslim women. Faculty of Sharea and Law, Al-Ahqaff University.

== Notable people ==
- Mohamed Alghoom: a world renowned Maestro and the leader of the Heritage Symphonies Project.
- Sayyid Al-Habib Umar bin Muhammad bin Salim bin Hafeez – Dean, Dar Al-Mustafa
- Sayyid Al-Habib Ali Mashhour bin Muhammad bin Salim bin Hafeez: Imam of the Tarim Mosque and Head of Fatwas Council
- Shaykh Amjad Rasheed: Islamic scholar
- Abdullah bin Omar al-Shatiri: Islamic scholar, died in 1942
- Habib Hasan bin Abdullah al-Shatiri: Grand Shaykh of Tarim, died in 2007.
- Al-Habib Salim bin Abdullah al-Shatiri : Grand Shaykh
- Al-Habib Kadhim Jafar Muhammad al-Saqqaf Leading scholar, and teacher at Dar Ul Mustafa
- Habib 'Ali Zain Al Abideen al-Jifri: Islamic scholar, and leading teacher of Dar Al-Mustafa
- Abdul Rahman Al-Mash-hoor
- Abu Bakr Salim Abdurrahman Balfaqih: Arab singer songwriter that gained popularity throughout the Arab world.

== See also ==
- Hadhramaut Mountains
- Qabr Hud

Preceded by Baku	Capital of Islamic Culture; 2010	Succeeded by Tlemcen
