= London Stadium =

Multi-purpose stadium in Stratford, London, England

Coordinates: 51°32′19″N 0°00′59″W

- Olympic Stadium

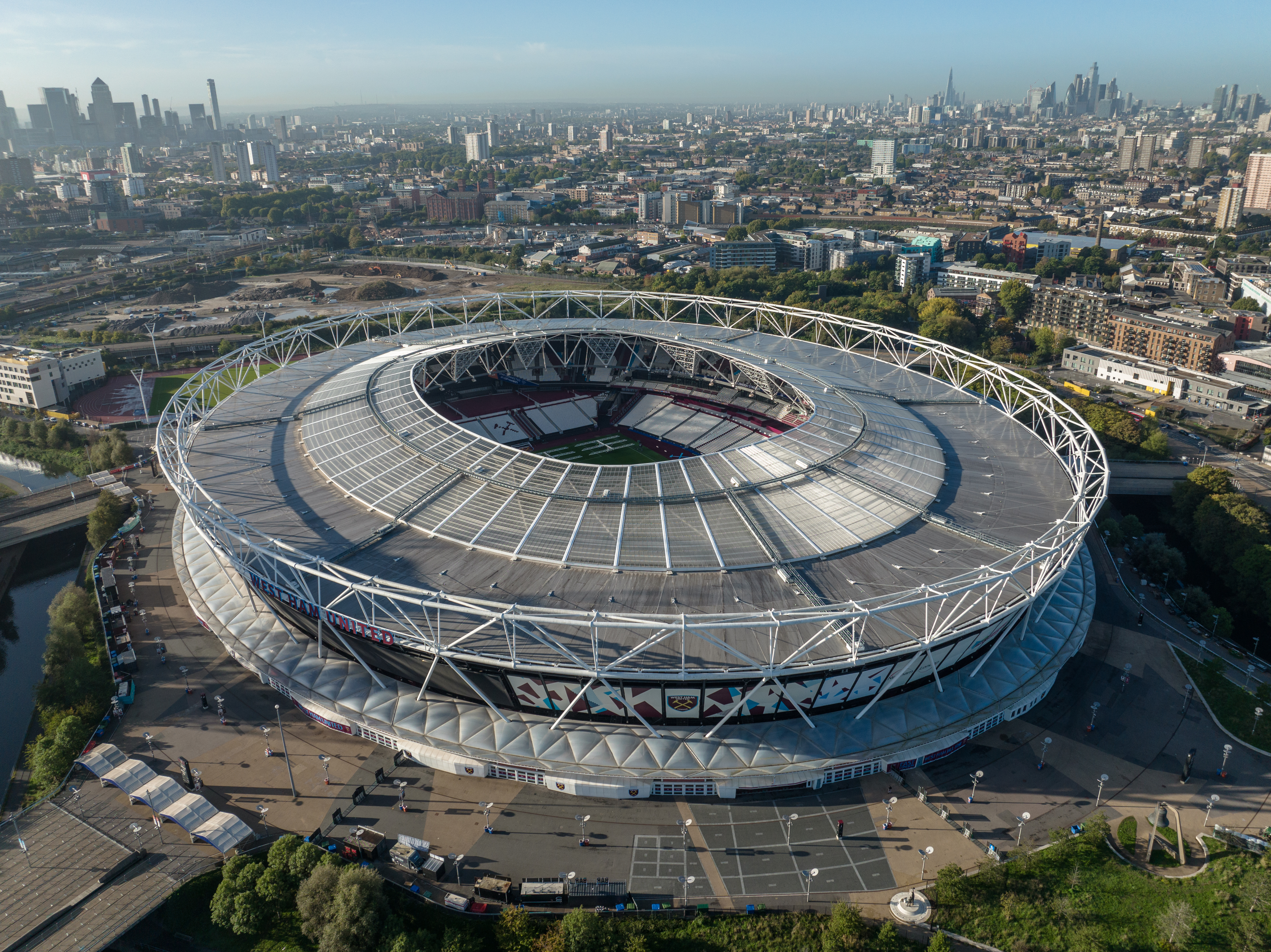
- View of the stadium in October 2022; UEFA
- Interactive map of London Stadium
- Former names: Olympic Stadium (2012); The Stadium at Queen Elizabeth Olympic Park (2013–2016)
- Address: Marshgate Lane
- Location: Queen Elizabeth Olympic Park; Stratford, London, England; E20 2ST
- Owner: London Stadium LLP (ultimately Greater London Authority)
- Operator: LS185 Limited (Note: A subsidiary of London Stadium LLP.)
- Capacity: 62,500 (regulated capacity); 68,013 (seated capacity); 80,000 (concerts)
- Surface: Grass (Desso GrassMaster); Track (Mondotrack/WS, 9 Lanes)
- Field size: 105 by 68 metres (114.8 yd × 74.4 yd)
- Public transit: Stratford; Stratford International; Pudding Mill Lane

Construction
- Groundbreaking: 22 May 2008; 18 years ago
- Built: 22 May 2008 – 29 March 2011
- Opened: 5 May 2012; 14 years ago
- Renovated: 2013–2016
- Cost: £486 million (£821 million in 2025 pounds) £274 million (2013–16 renovations)
- Architects: Populous (formerly HOK Sport), led by Philip Johnson
- Project manager: Savills
- Structural engineer: Buro Happold
- Services engineer: M-E Engineers
- General contractor: Balfour Beatty
- Main contractor: Sir Robert McAlpine

Tenants
- UK Athletics (2015–present); West Ham United (2016–present)

Website
- london-stadium.com

London Stadium (formerly and also known as the Olympic Stadium and the Stadium at Queen Elizabeth Olympic Park) is a multi-purpose outdoor stadium at Queen Elizabeth Olympic Park in the Stratford district of London. It is located in the Lower Lea Valley, 6 miles (10 km) east of central London. The stadium was originally constructed for the 2012 Summer Olympics and 2012 Summer Paralympics, serving as the athletics venue and as the site of their opening and closing ceremonies. Following the Games, it was rebuilt for multi-purpose use and now serves primarily as the home of football club West Ham United, who became anchor tenants from the 2016 season. UK athletics are the other tenants in the stadium and host a round of the World Athletics Diamond League each year, known as the London Grand Prix, sometimes called the London Anniversary Games.

Land preparation for the stadium began in mid-2007, with the construction officially starting on 22 May 2008. The stadium held 80,000 people for the Olympics and the Paralympic games, before it was remodelled between 2013 and 2015 with 66,000 seats, but with capacity for football limited to 60,000 under the terms of the lease. The decision of what happened to the stadium post Olympics had to be run twice after the first process was delayed by legal cases and a complaint to the European Commission in regards to state aid. It was decided to run a second round of bidding for the stadium, this time keeping it in public ownership and seeking an anchor tenant instead of an owner.

The stadium has been owned and operated by different companies starting with the London Organising Committee of the Olympic and Paralympic Games (LOCOG). In October 2012, the whole park including the stadium was handed over to the London Legacy Development Corporation (LLDC) who set up a subsidiary company with Newham Council known as E20 Stadium LLP in July 2012 to oversee the stadium. In 2015, Vinci SA was appointed to manage the Stadium for a 25-year period through London Stadium 185. Newham Council left the E20 Stadium partnership in 2017 and its stake was taken by the LLDC. The LLDC bought LS185 from Vinci in 2019. In January 2025 the LLDC relinquished its interest in E20 Stadium LLP and LS185 to GLA Holdings Ltd. E20 Stadium LLP was renamed London Stadium LLP on 3 April 2025.

== Stadium operator ==
The stadium during the Olympic and Paralympic Games was owned by the London Organising Committee of the Olympic and Paralympic Games (LOCOG) and the Olympic Delivery Authority.

Following the collapse of the first deal for the stadium over state aid and the wish to keep the stadium in public ownership; the London Borough of Newham withdrew from the West Ham bid and intended to contribute to the funding of the Stadium with the OPLC. It was decided that a Special-purpose vehicle (SPV) would be created which the £40m, from the first tender process would be invested through a subsidiary company called Newham Legacy Investments (NLI). Accounting firms concluded that a limited liability partnership (LLP) was the most appropriate structure for the SPV. In October 2012 the whole park including the stadium was handed over to the London Legacy Development Corporation (LLDC); which had replaced the public sector, not-for-profit company limited Olympic Park Legacy Company in April 2012 under the Localism Act 2011 as the responsible body to redevelop the Olympic Park after the Games. The LLDC and Newham Council, set up another subsidiary company known as E20 Stadium LLP in July 2012 to take long term responsibility for managing the Stadium.

In October 2014, The Evening Standard reported that French company Vinci SA were favourites to be given a contract to run the stadium for ten years. The company had reportedly beaten off competition from other companies including Anschutz Entertainment Group. In February 2015, Vinci Stadium, a subsidiary of Vinci Concessions, were appointed to manage it starting in April 2015 for a 25-year period becoming the first stadium outside France to be managed by Vinci. The company is also responsible for the London Marathon Charitable Trust Community Track and events on the south park lawn. Vinci set up a subsidiary company called London Stadium 185 (LS185), with the 185 signifying how many medals were won by British athletes at the London Olympic and Paralympic Games. In January 2019, the LLDC bought LS185 from Vinci after concerns were raised following a £3.5 million loss the previous year, with all staff being retained.

NLI and Newham Council relinquished its stake in E20 Stadium LLP in November 2017. Stratford East London Holdings LTD (SELH), a new subsidiary company of the LLDC, was formed and took over NLI's stake in the partnership. In November 2024 the LLDC voted to hand over their interest in E20 Stadium LLP, as well as subsidiaries SELH and LS185, to GLA Holdings Ltd, a subsidiary company of Greater London Authority (GLA). This was completed in January 2025 with E20 Stadium LLP being renamed London Stadium LLP from April 2025. The change was made to simplify and consolidate the ownership structure, removing the need for duplicative administrative requirements, rationalise leadership and enable the stadium to be directly managed by the GLA rather than the LLDC, which has less grant funding to support the stadium's governance.

== History ==
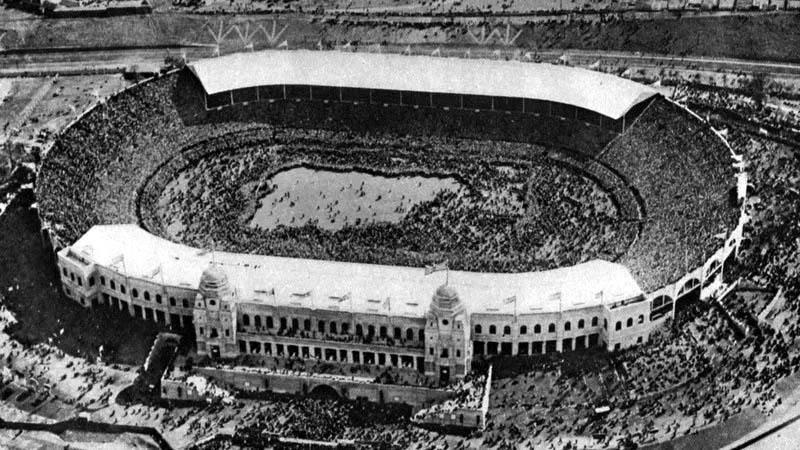
Wembley was proposed to be demolished and replaced with a new stadium on the same site as a national stadium for athletics, football and rugby league.

Great Britain had bid for three successive summer Olympic Games between 1992 and 2000. There had been two failed attempts to bring the Olympic Games to Manchester, and one to Birmingham. The International Olympic Committee (IOC) indicated that if Britain was serious about hosting the Games, then a proposal from London would be the one that the committee would listen to, according to British Olympic Association (BOA) chief executive Simon Clegg. In 1997 the BOA appointed David Luckes to conduct a feasibility study about hosting the games. By 2000 Luckes had come up with two proposals:

- One based on west London around Wembley Stadium. The old Wembley Stadium was acknowledged by 1994 to have reached the end of its useful life. In October 1996 Wembley was picked as the site for a proposed national stadium for football, rugby and athletics.
- One involving the regeneration of an area of east London stretching from the Isle of Dogs (in the Docklands), through Stratford and north into the Lower Lee Valley. This would be tagged on to an existing proposal to regenerate the area.

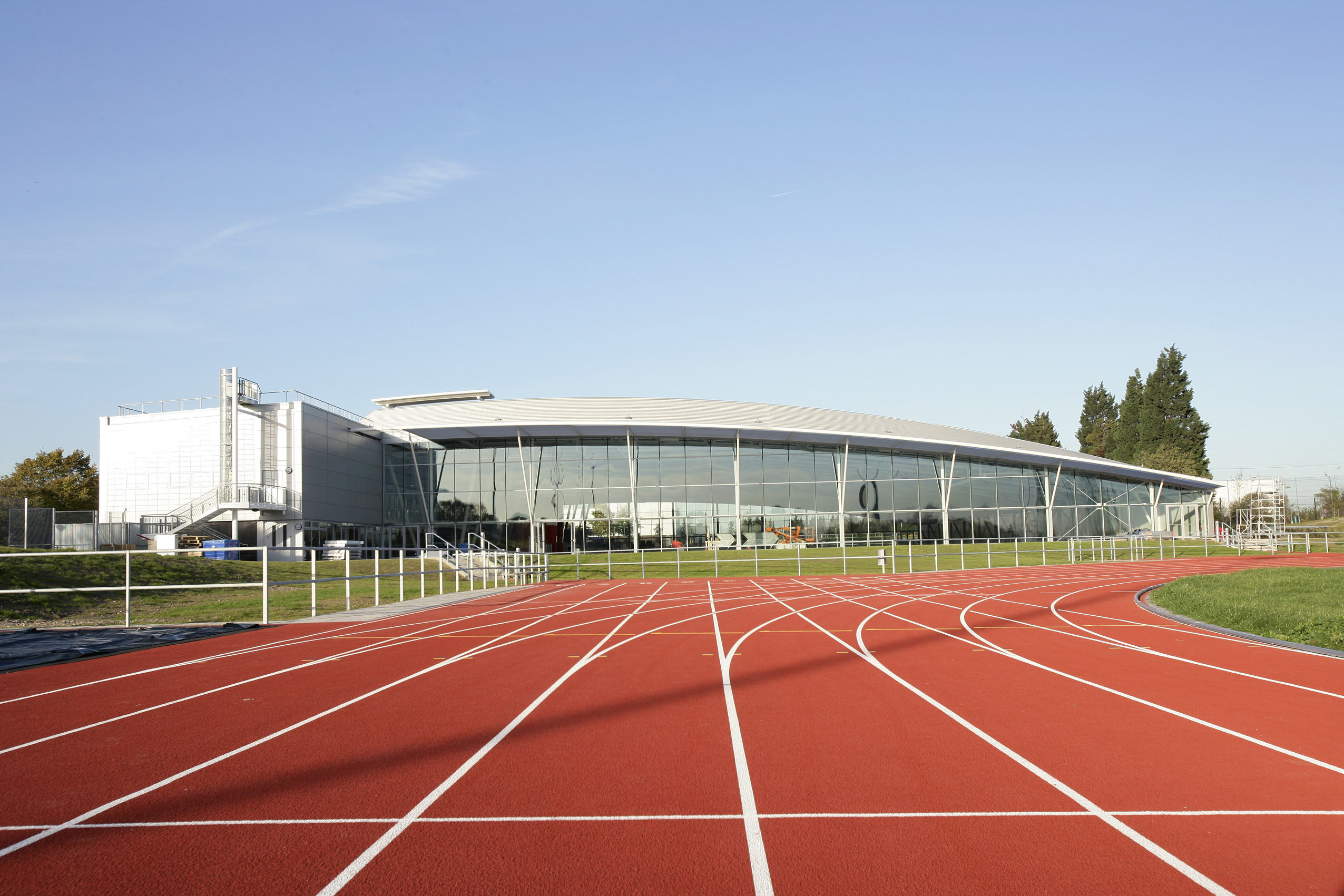
The Lee Valley Athletics Centre was built on the proposed site of the Picketts Lock Stadium.

Culture Secretary Chris Smith removed athletics from a Wembley stadium rebuild in December 1999, stating that UK Athletics would have to find a different venue. A House of Commons Select committee for Culture, Media and Sport disagreed with the decision noting that it was beyond the proper responsibilities of the minister. A new stadium was announced in March 2000 for Picketts Lock in the Lower Lea Valley to host the 2005 World Championships in Athletics. It was noted that the Picketts Lock Stadium could be expanded to host 80,000 people for any future summer Olympic Games bid. In October 2001 Great Britain withdrew from hosting the World Athletics Championships at Picketts Lock and the proposed stadium was cancelled on cost grounds with David Bond noting that the decision was likely to end any hopes of bringing the Olympics to London. The Picketts Lock area was considered for an Olympic park, however was not favoured due to its distance to existing venues and the city. It was noted by the bid team that had a more strategic view had been taken to bid for an Olympic Games when proposing the stadium, then Stratford (which was dismissed at the time) would have been more a suitable site.

When Beijing won the 2008 Olympic Games in 2001, this left the way open, under the IOC's policies on awarding Olympic Games, for London to bid for the 2012 Games using the land earmarked in east London. London Mayor Livingstone supported a bid for the games as long as it regenerated east London. In 2002 Mayor Livingstone stated that the proposed site was in Stratford. By then it had been decided that Wembley Stadium would be able to host athletics, as a platform for a track was built into the stadium's design; however it could not be the focal point for the Games. Clegg stated that the seating in the stadium would have to be reconfigured, and there would not be enough seats left to meet the requirements of the IOC. In addition he noted that any future bid would focus on east London. In May 2003 the British government gave the go ahead for an Olympic bid. London's bid book was submitted to the IOC in 2004 and confirmed the idea of an Olympic park and stadium in the east of the city. The IOC awarded London the right to host the 2012 Olympic Games after the city won the most votes in July 2005.

=== Location ===
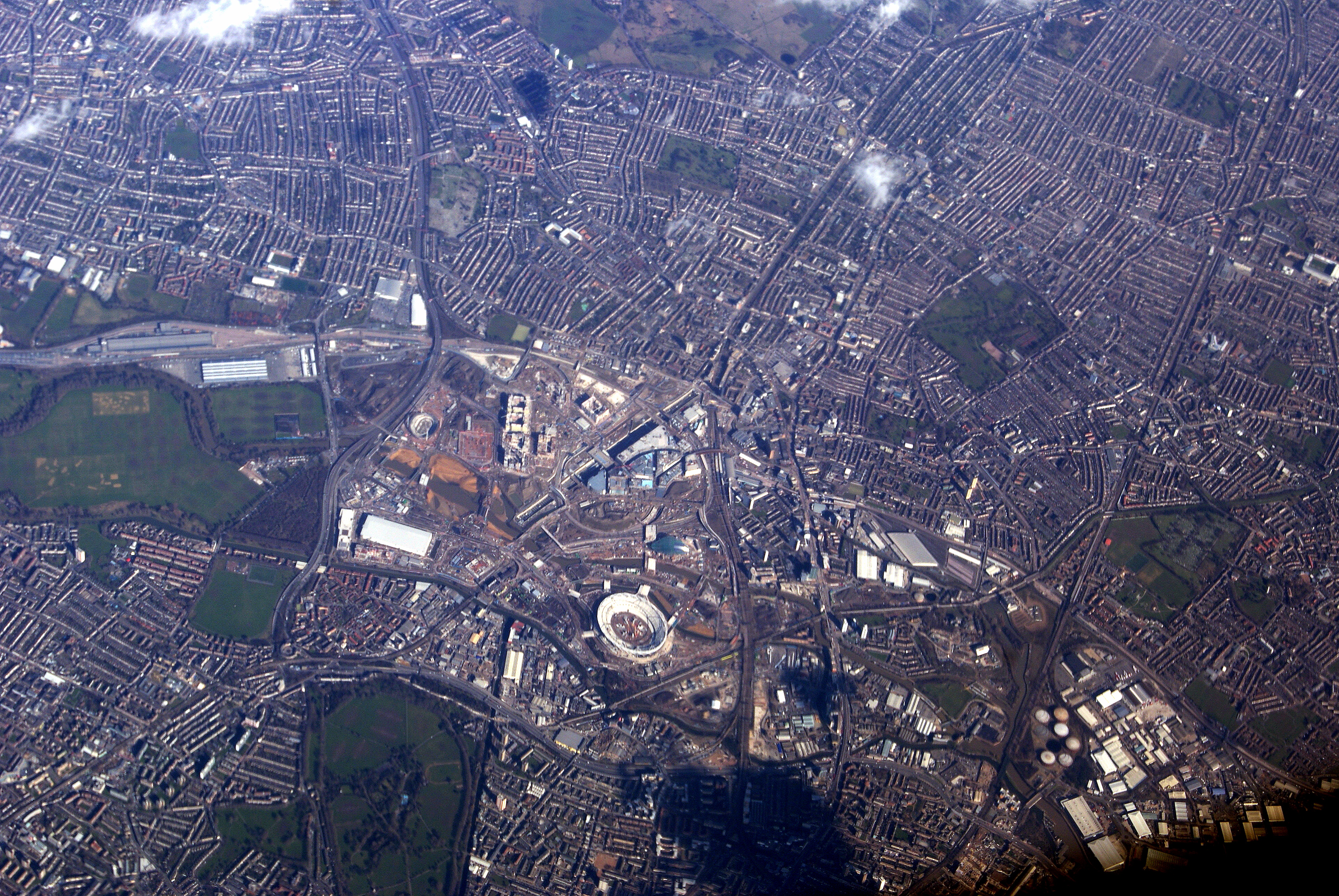
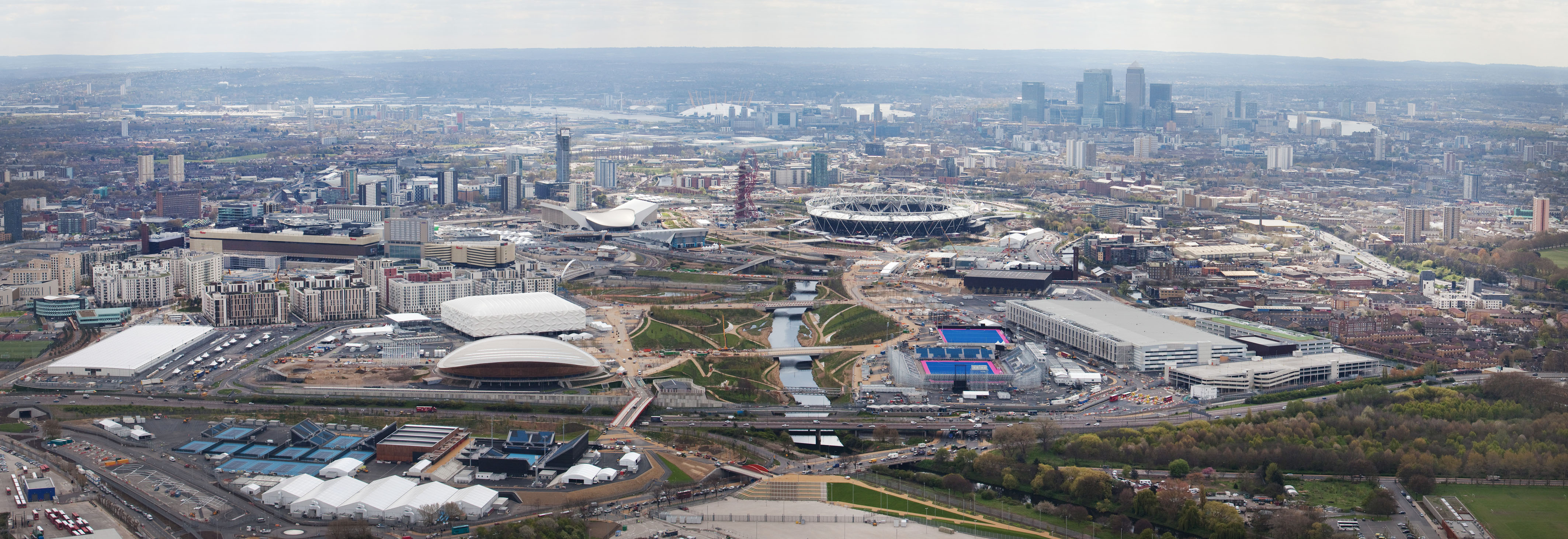
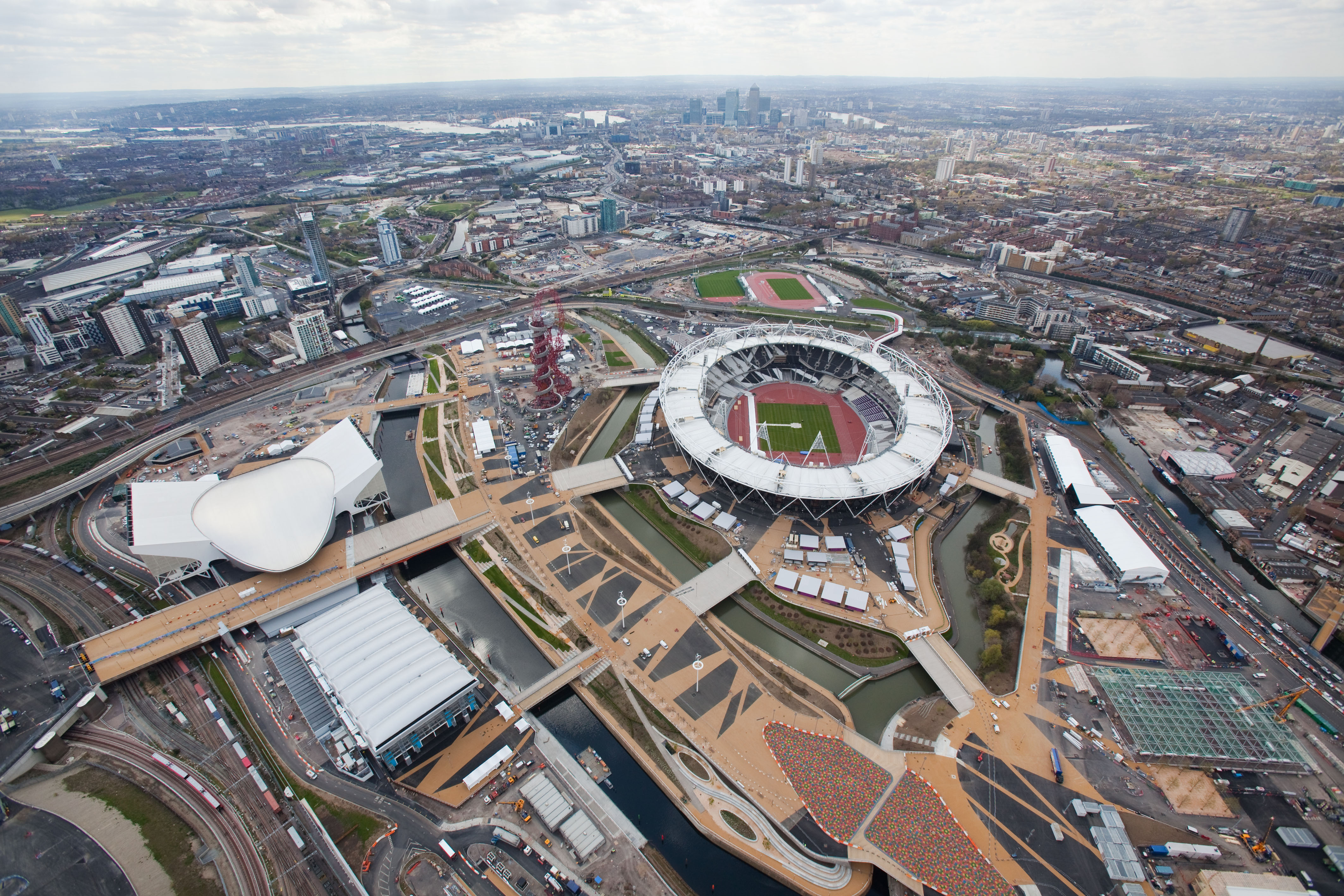
Clockwise from top left. Aerial view of the Olympic stadium and park, looking north, Upton Park also visible. Picture two is looking south across the Olympic Park. Image three shows the waterways around the stadium.

The stadium site is on former industrial land between the River Lea (which rejoins the Navigation below Old Ford Lock), the City Mill River, and the Old Pudding Mill River, parts of the Bow Back Rivers. Another branch of this system, St Thomas' Creek, 200 metres (660 feet) to the south, completes an "island" surrounded by water. 200 metres (660 feet) to the east is the Waterworks River; with the London Aquatics Centre on its eastern bank. This "island" site for the stadium lies at the southern end of the Olympic Park. To make room for its construction, the already partially obstructed Pudding Mill River, a short channel of the Lea that ran from the west side of the stadium south-eastwards across the site, was filled in. A number of businesses were required to move for the stadium and park. During the bidding for the 2012 Olympics a group of businesses in Marshgate Lane, where the stadium was to be built, wrote to the IOC to withdraw their support for the plans due to unfair treatment.

It was found in 2005 that the site of the stadium was host to Queen Mary College's department of nuclear engineering, which had a small nuclear reactor.

The stadium is situated in the southern part of the Queen Elizabeth Olympic Park in the Stratford district of London. It is located in the Lower Lea Valley, 6 miles (10 km) east of central London.

== Design and construction ==
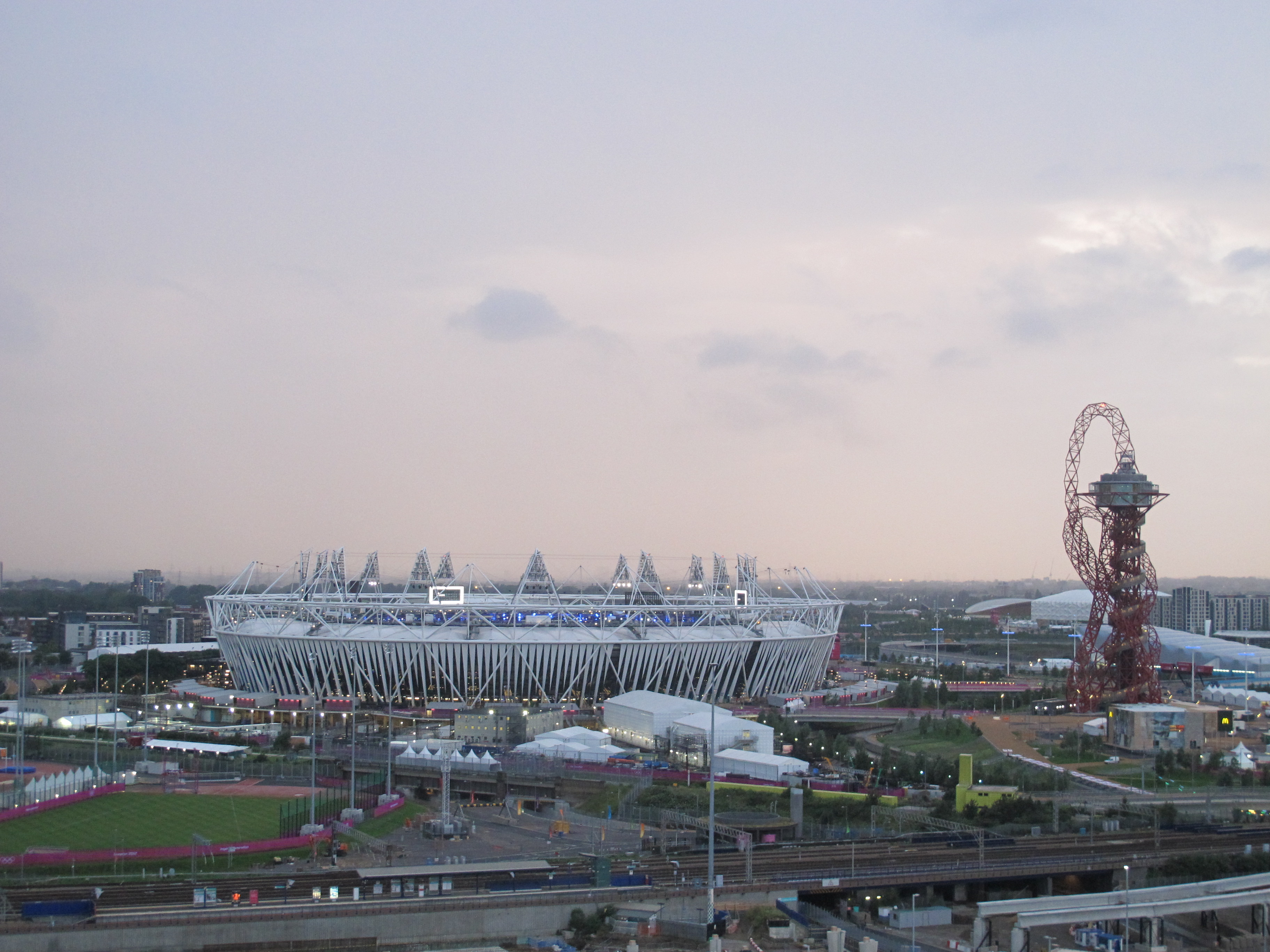
The stadium in July 2012

=== Design brief ===
During London's bid for the games, promotional materials featured a main stadium with a roof "designed to wrap itself around the venue like muscles supporting the body". The government preferred to produce a brief for an athletics-only stadium that would be largely disassembled after the Games, with the lower tier remaining in place as a permanent athletics facility to replace the Crystal Palace National Sports Centre.

On 13 October 2006, the London Organising Committee of the Olympic and Paralympic Games (LOCOG) selected Sir Robert McAlpine and Populous to start exclusive negotiations to fulfil the design-and-build contract of the Stadium, after no other organisations met the bidding criteria. The stadium design was launched on 7 November 2007.

=== Construction ===
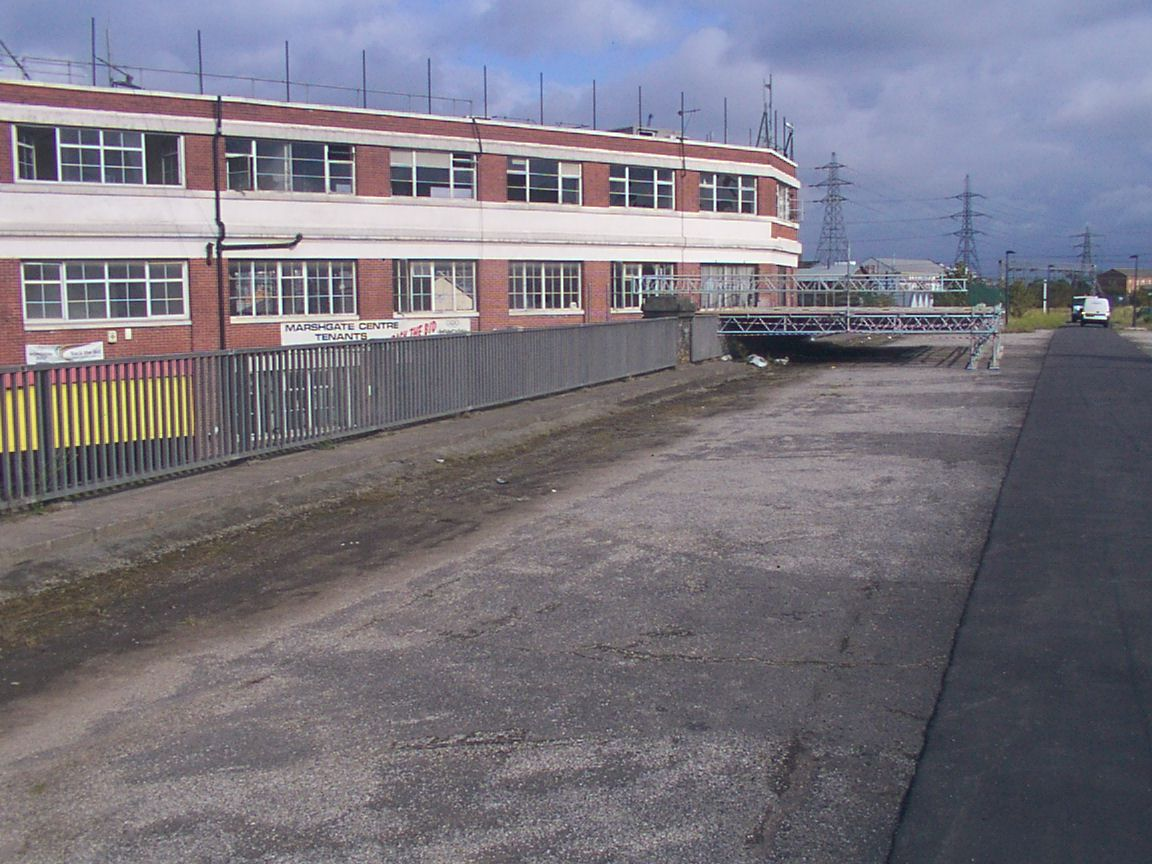
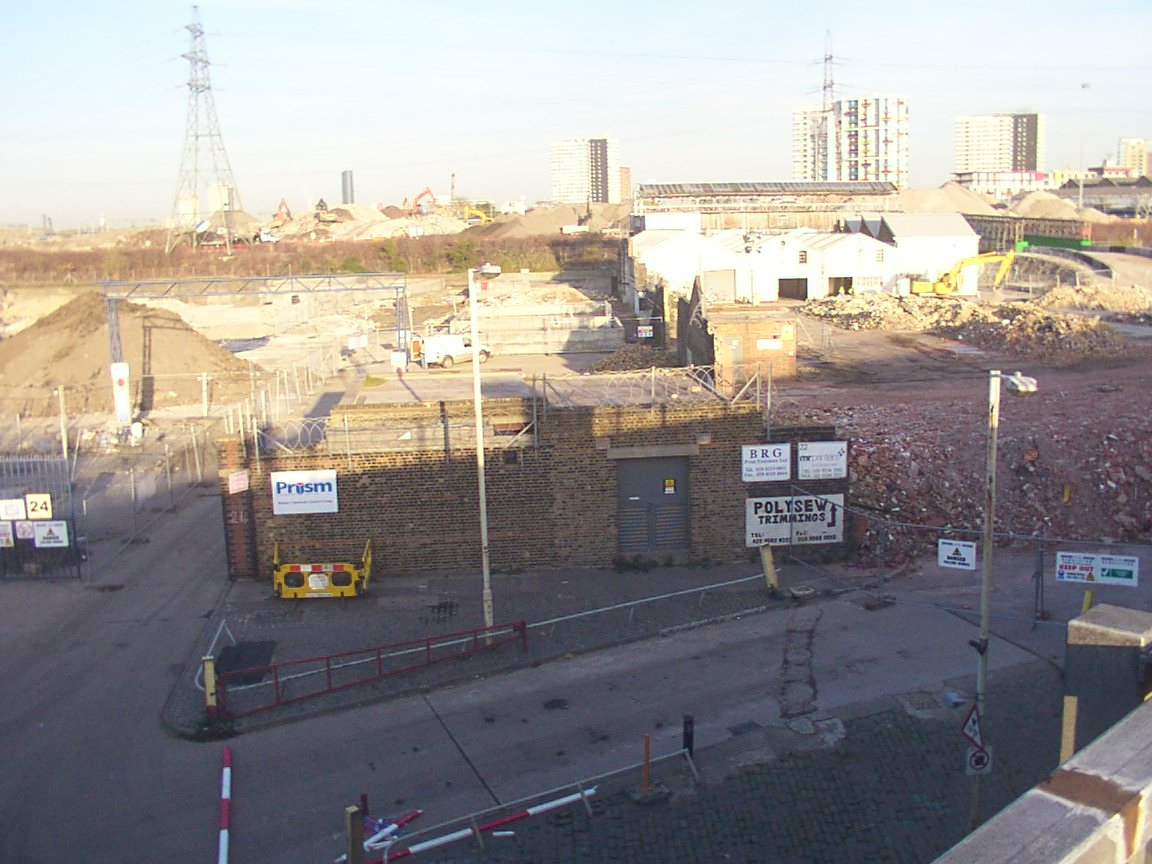
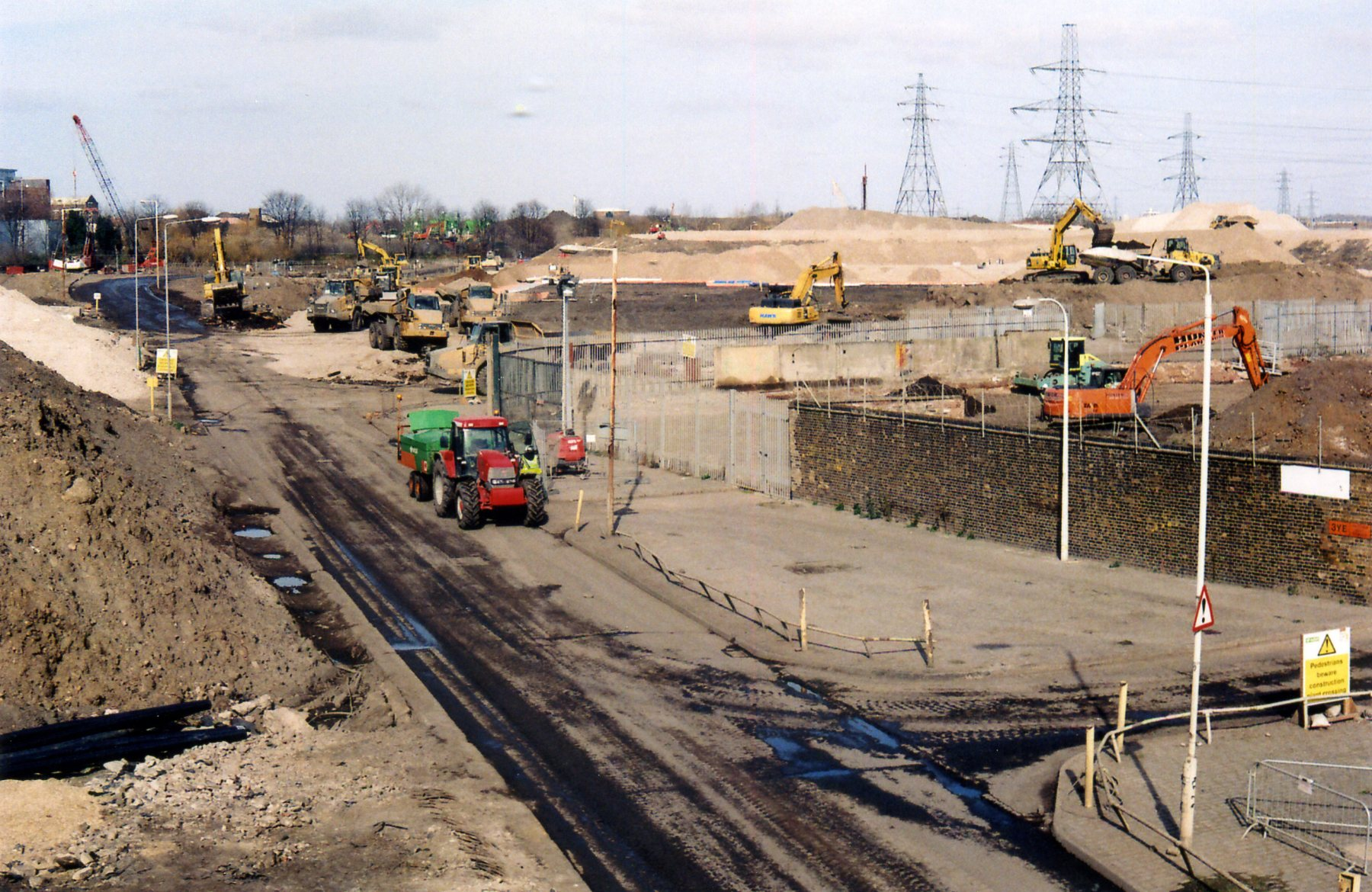
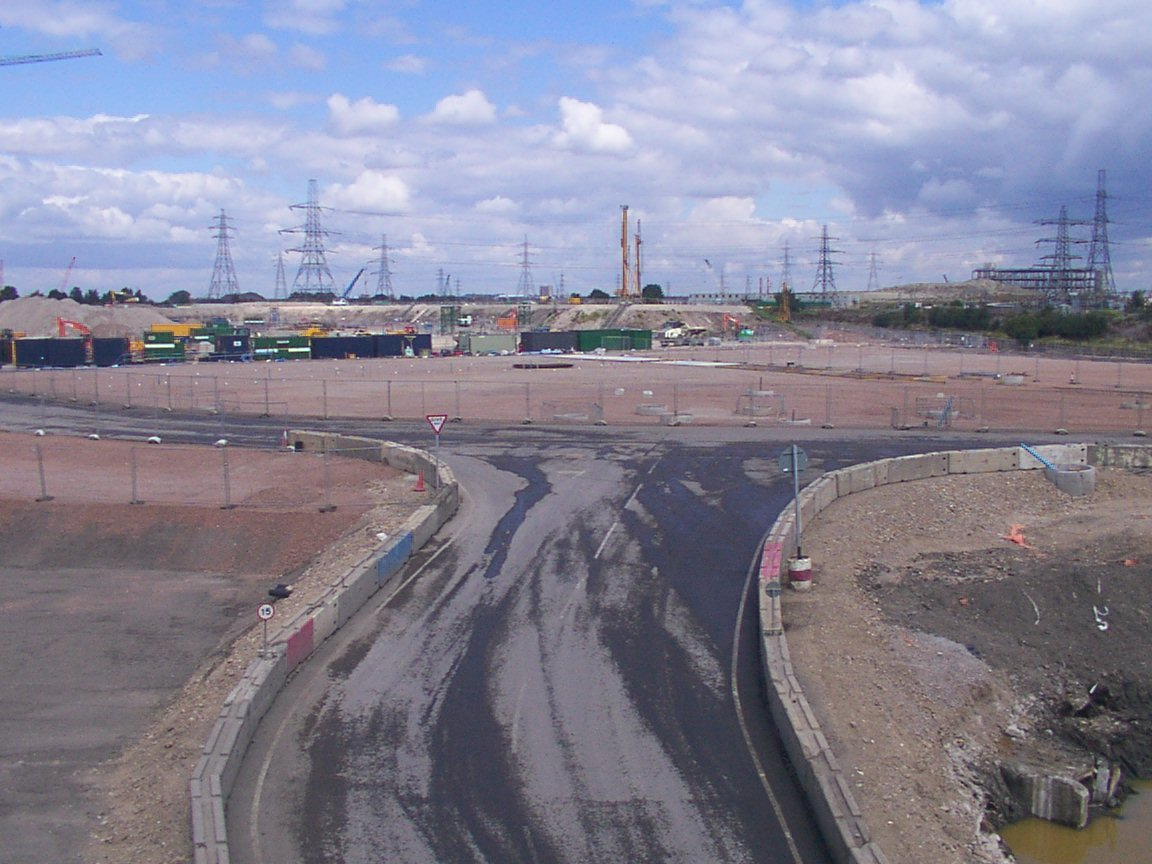
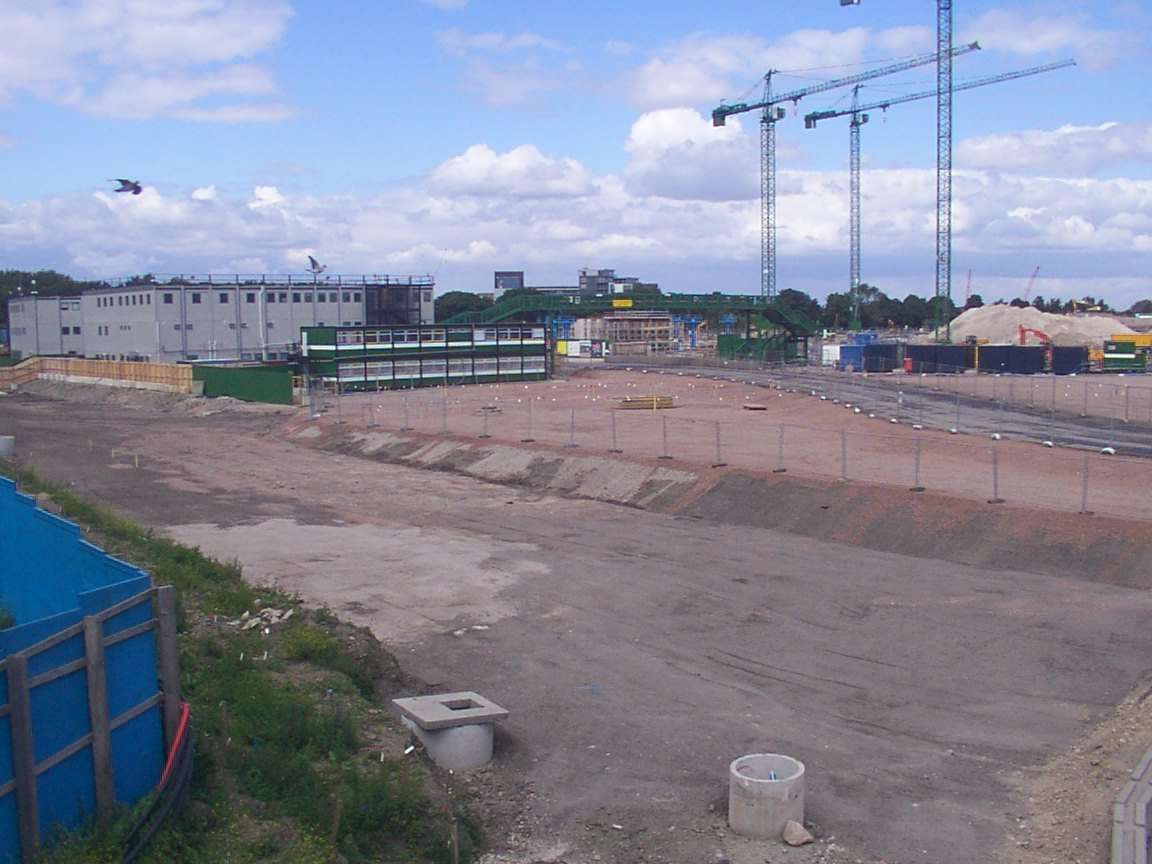
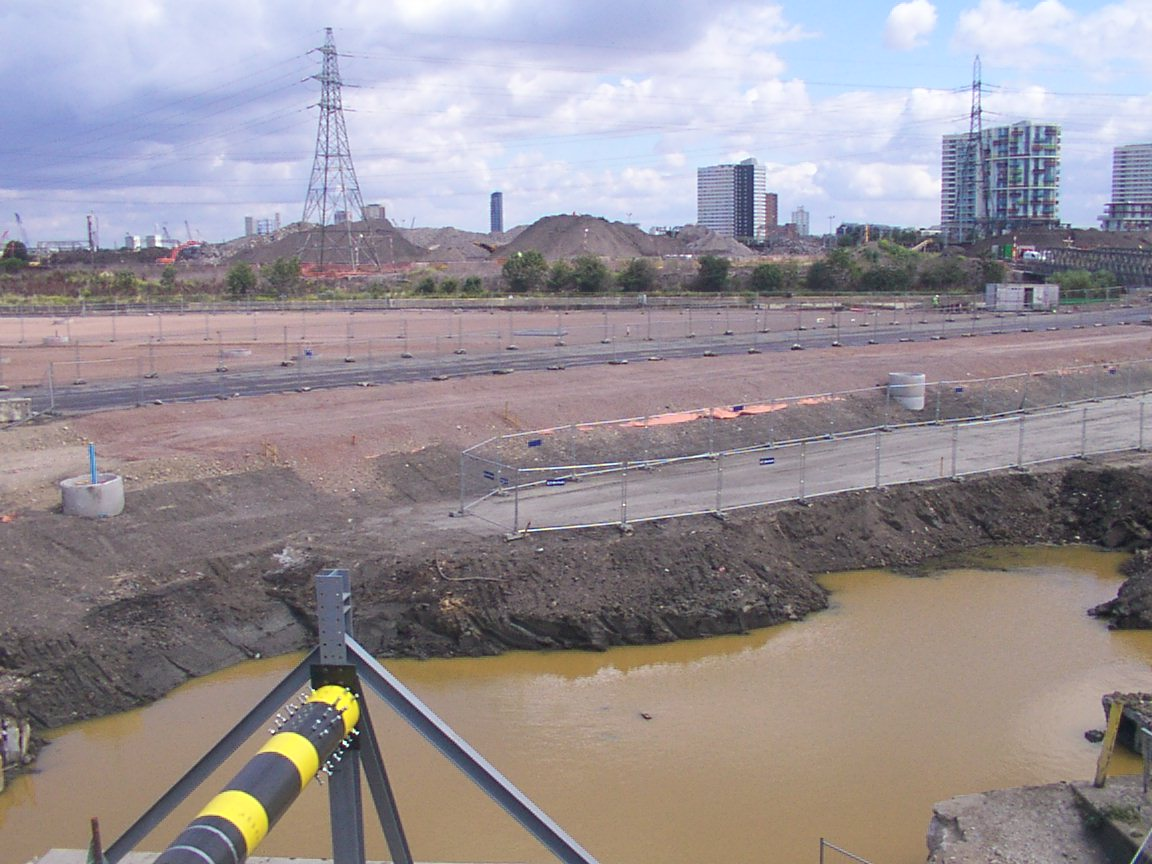
Site of the stadium before construction and during site preparation.

Construction of the stadium commenced three months early in May 2008, after the bowl of the structure had been excavated and the area cleared. The building of the stadium was completed in March 2011 reportedly on time and under budget, with the athletics track laid in October 2011.

Exploded view of the stadium's layers

The stadium's track-and-field arena is excavated out of the soft clay found on the site, around which is permanent seating for 25,000, built using concrete "rakers". The natural slope of the land is incorporated into the design, with warm-up and changing areas dug into a semi-basement position at the lower end. Spectators enter the stadium via a podium level, which is aligned with the top of the permanent seating bowl. A lightweight demountable steel and pre-cast concrete upper tier was built up from this "bowl" to accommodate a further 55,000 spectators.

The stadium has two tiers:

- The base tier, which allows for 25,000 seats, is a sunken elliptical bowl made up of low-carbon-dioxide concrete; this contains 40 per cent less embodied carbon than conventional concrete. The foundation of the base level is 5,000 piles reaching up to 20 metres (66 ft) deep. There are a mixture of driven cast in situ piles, continuous flight auger piles, and vibro concrete columns.
- The second tier holds 55,000 seats and measures 315 by 256 m (344 by 280 yd) and is 60 m (197 ft) high.

The stadium contains just under a quarter of the amount of steel used in the Olympic Stadium in Beijing for the 2008 Summer Olympics: about 10,700 tons. In addition to the minimal use of steel, which makes it 75 per cent lighter, the stadium also uses high-yield large diameter pipes that were surplus on completion of North Sea gas pipeline projects in its compression truss, and recycled granite. Many of the building materials were transported on trains and barges rather than by lorry.

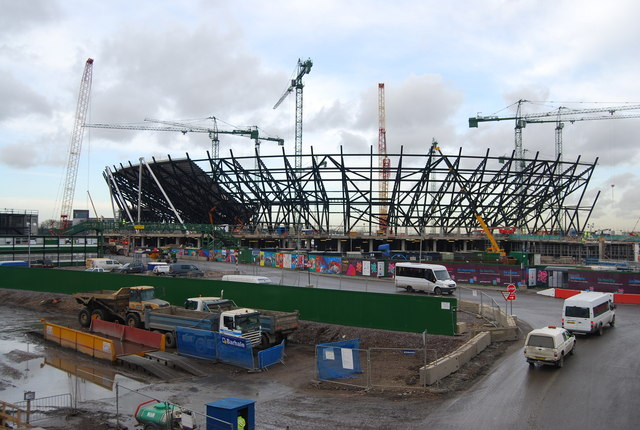
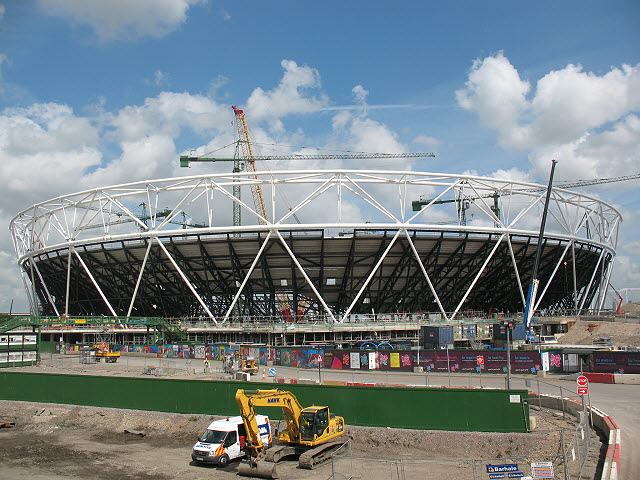
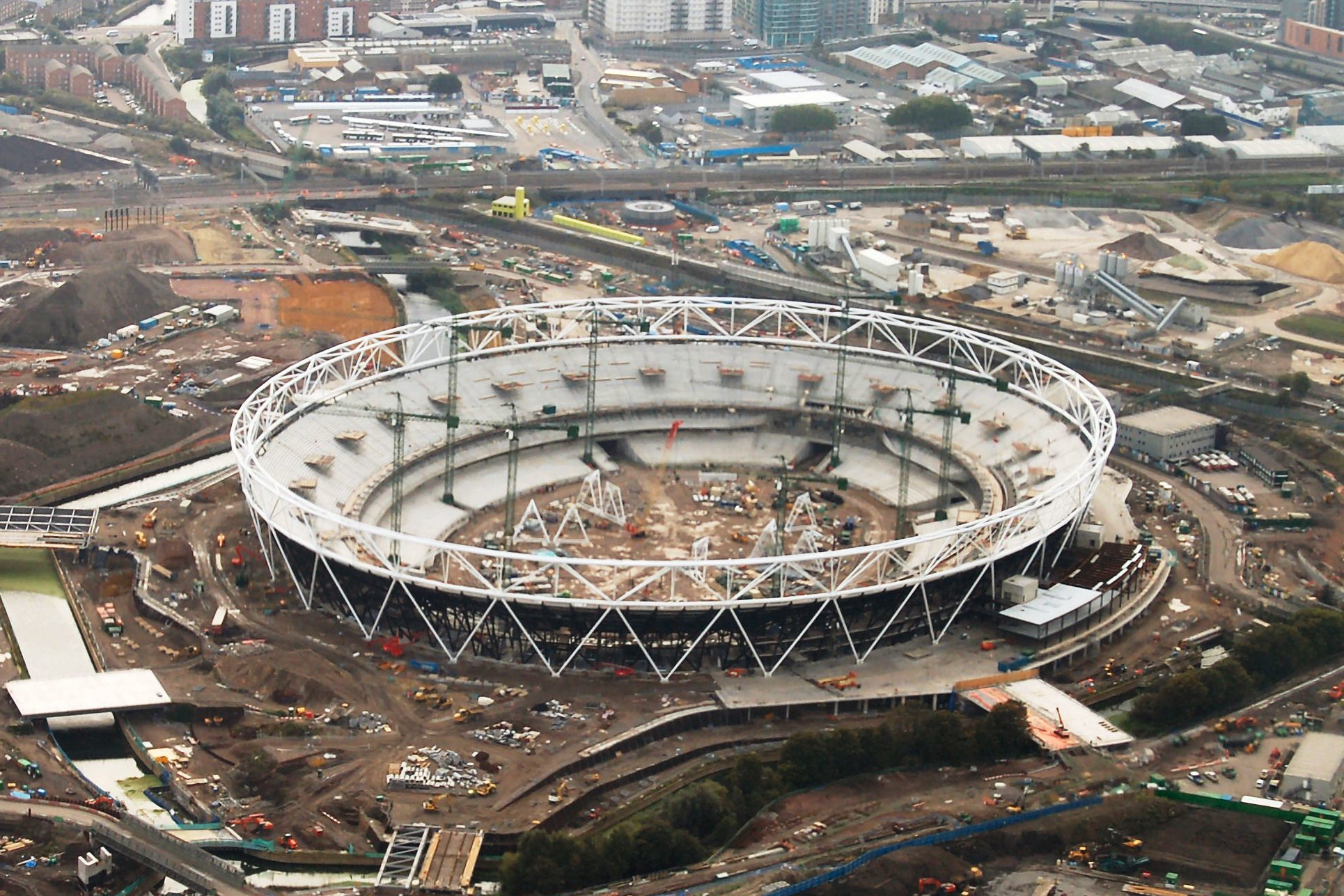
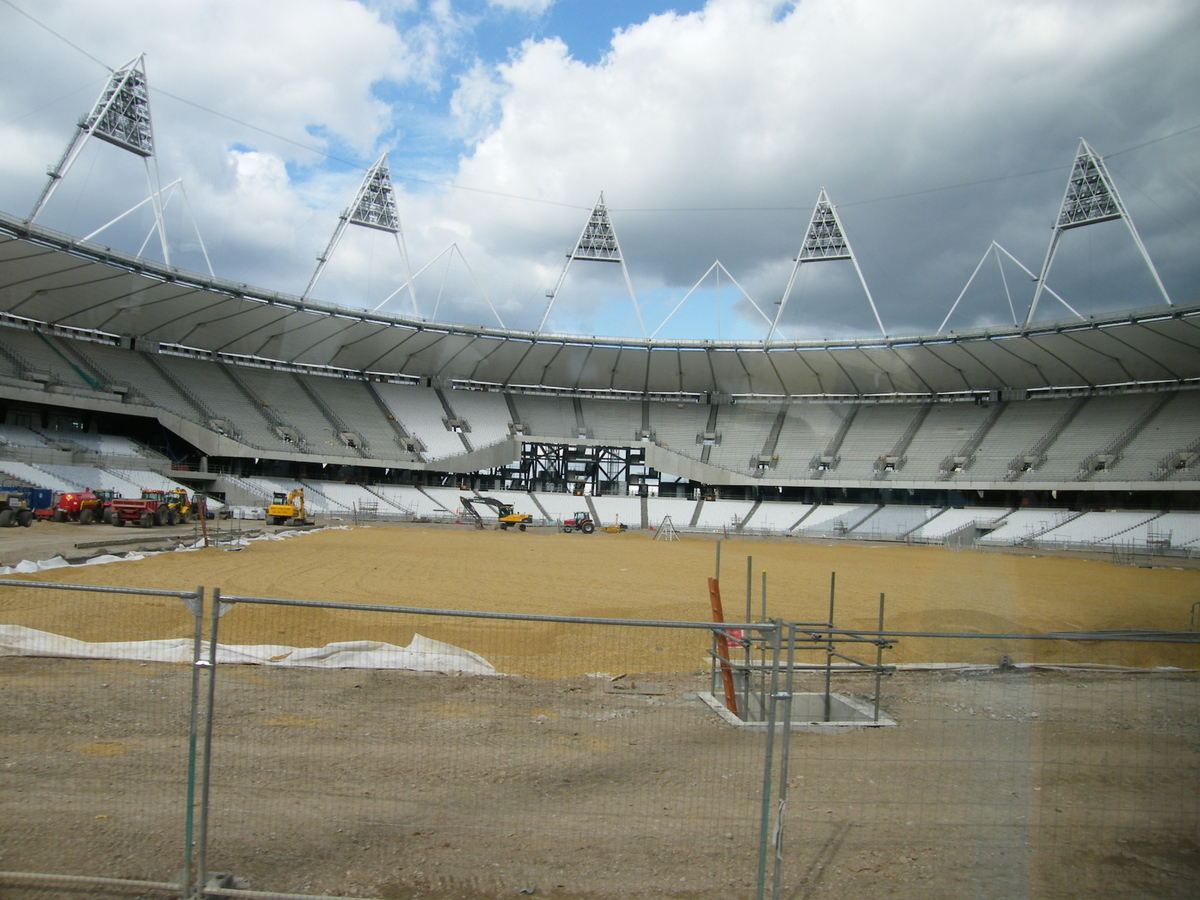
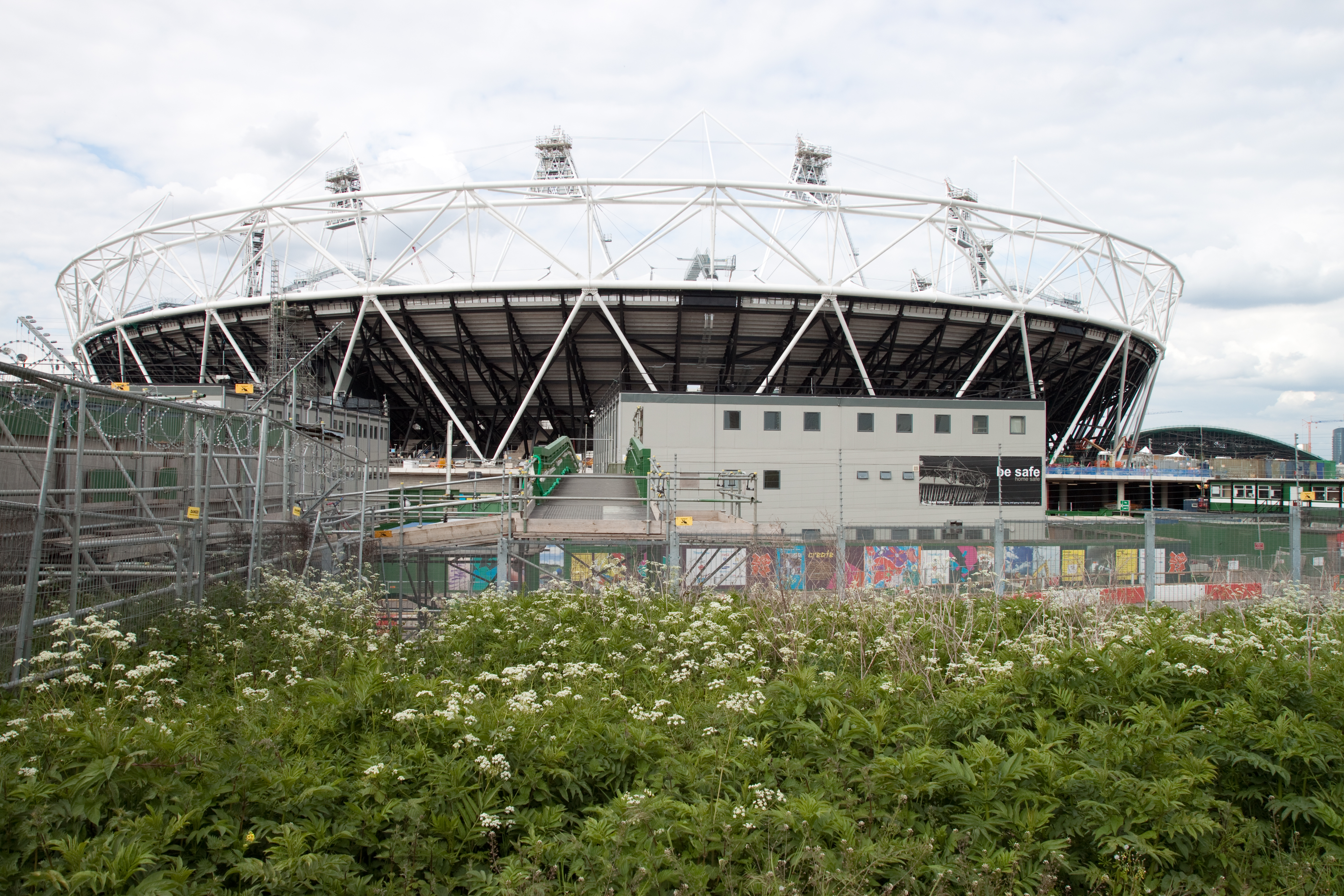
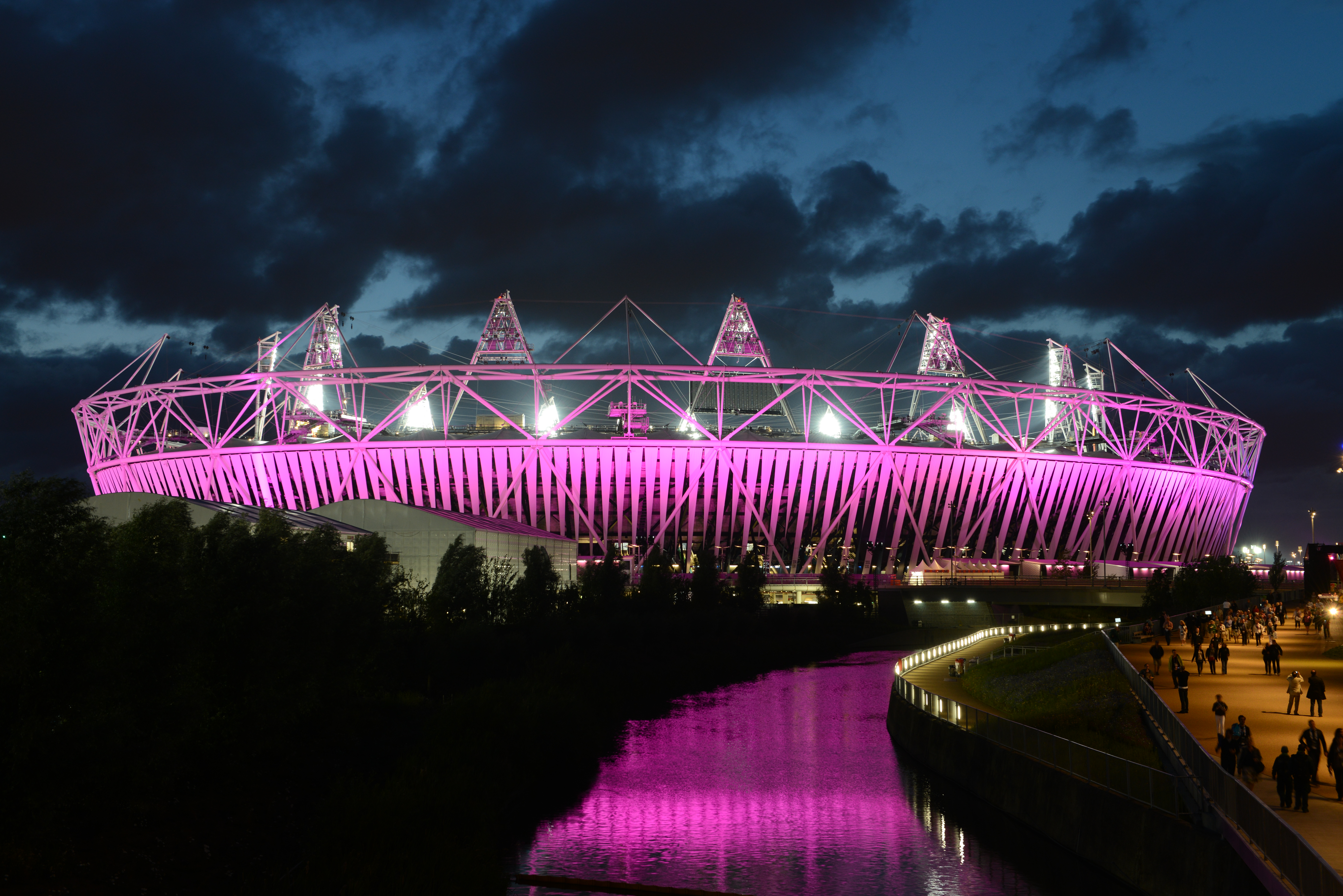
Various stages of construction up to finished product.

A wrap, which was announced in the initial designs was scrapped in 2010 during cost saving measures; but was reinstated months later in early 2011 to minimise cross winds. The wrap funded by Dow Chemical Company who were allowed to advertise on it until 26 June 2012, covered the exterior of the stadium. The wrap was made from polyester and polyethene and printed using UV curable inks. The wrap was made of pieces of material covering 20 metres (66 ft) high and 900 metres (1,000 yd) in length. The final design for the wrap consisted of 2.5-metre-wide (8 ft 2 in) fabric panels, twisted at 90-degree angles to allow entry to the stadium at the bottom of the structure, and held in place with tensioned cables.

To allow for fast on-site assembly, compression truss and roof column connections were bolted; this also enabled easy disassembling of the roof structure after the closing ceremonies. The cable-supported roof structure covered approximately two-thirds of the stadium's seating. Reaching 70 metres (230 ft) above the field of play, its roof held 14 lighting towers that collectively contained a total of 532 individual 2 kW floodlight lamps. The lights were first officially switched on in December 2010 by Prime Minister David Cameron and London Mayor Boris Johnson. During the Games, the towers were fitted with additional ceremony lighting, and four of the towers held large temporary video screens.

A temporary athletics warmup track was constructed for the 2012 games to the South of the Greenway.

==== Stadium interior ====
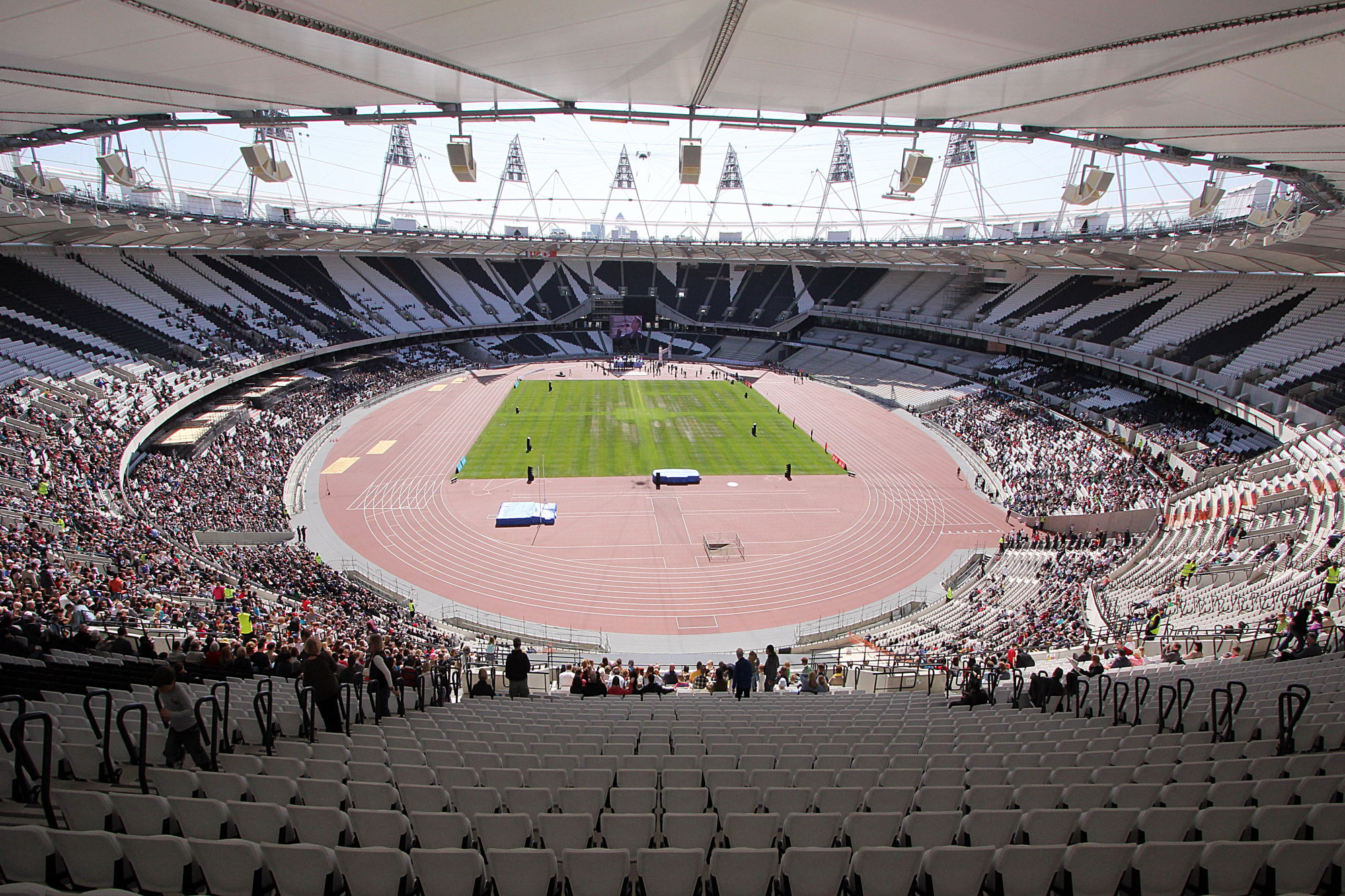
Olympic Stadium interior

The stadium was equipped with a nine lane Mondo 400 metres (440 yards) athletics track. The turf in the stadium was grown in Scunthorpe and was a mix of perennial ryegrass, smooth stalk meadow grass, and fescue grass seeds. It took 360 rolls of grass to cover the infield and was laid in March 2011. The track laid was made by Italian company Mondo who installed the Mondotrack FTX model. The track was 13.5 mm (0.5 inches) thick and used two vulcanised rubber layers, one of which was a cushioning underside with elongated diamond-shaped cells, which allowed them to flex in any direction. The stadium's 80,000 seats had a black-and-white 'fragment' theme that matched the overall branding design used by LOCOG for London 2012. The lines all centred on the finish line on the track. The seats were made in Luton and were fitted between May and December 2010.

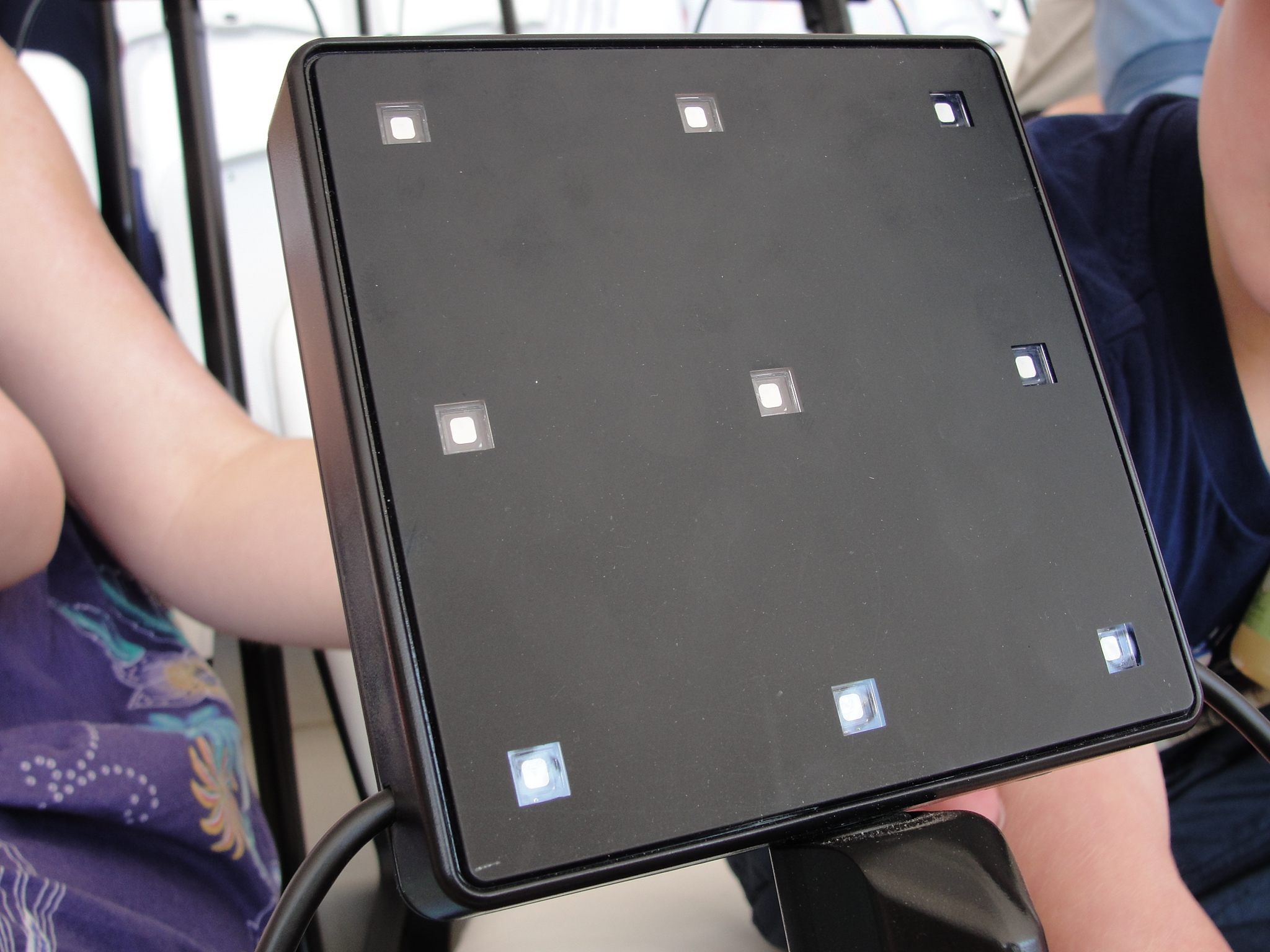
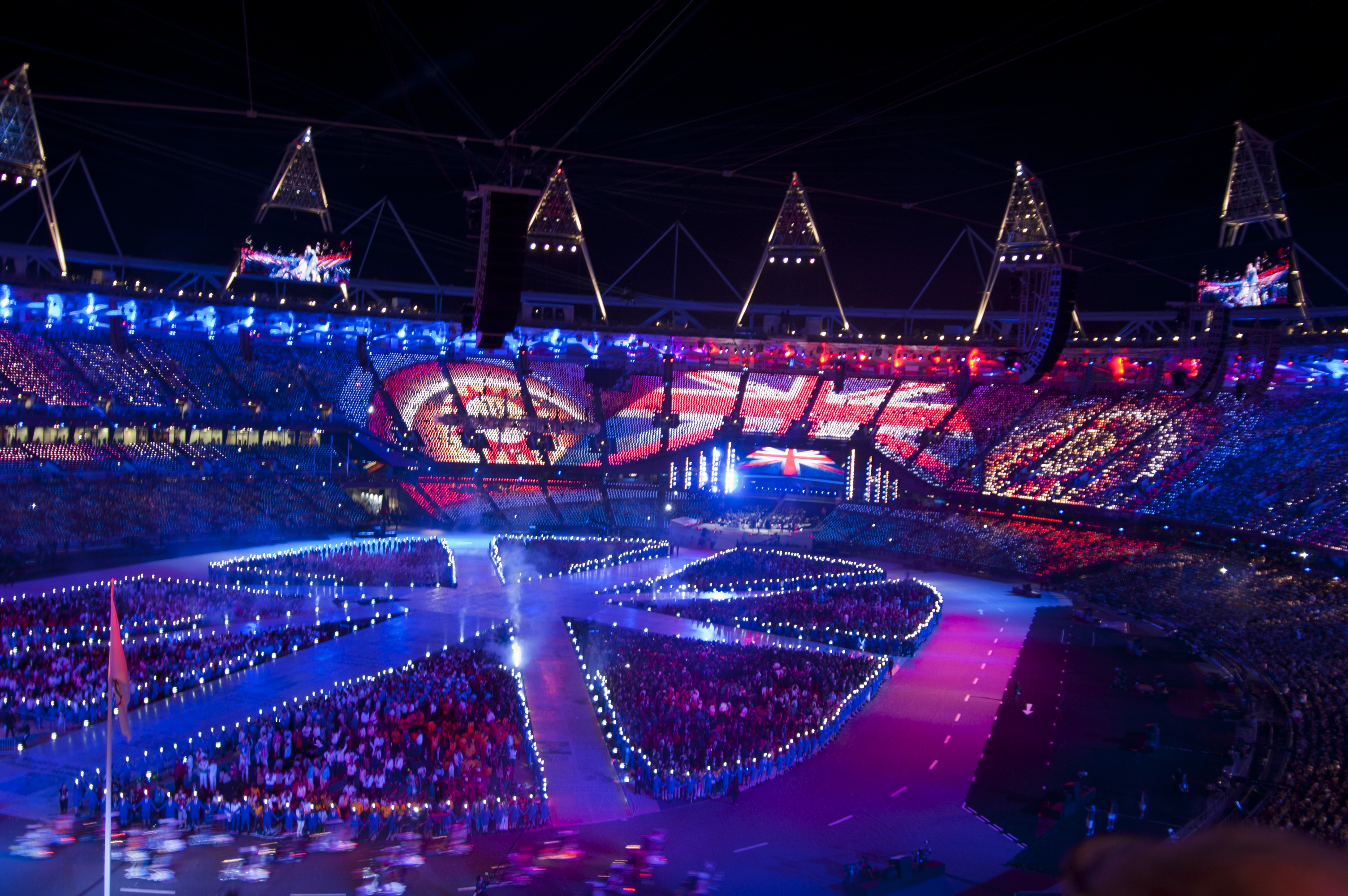
Lighting paddles were connected to every seat (left) to create a variety of effects (right).

During the Games, the Stadium's grandstands contained a lighting system developed by Tait Technologies that allowed them to function as a giant video screen, later called Landscape video. 70,500 individual "paddles" containing nine LED pixels each were installed between each seat, which were controlled via a central system to display video content wrapped around the stadium. The Stadium took a Guinness World Record for the Largest landscape video display, during the opening ceremony with 634,500 sources of light. This technology was also adopted for the Pyeongchang Olympic Stadium, which hosted the 2018 Winter Olympics.

=== Response ===
Initially, the stadium design received a mixed response from the media, with reviews ranging from "magnificent" to the derisory "bowl of blancmange". The design was promoted as an example of "sustainable development", but some architecture critics have questioned both its aesthetic value and suitability as a national icon – especially when compared with Beijing National Stadium. For example, Ellis Woodman, Building Design's architecture critic, said of the design: "The principle of it being dismountable is most welcome... it demonstrates an obvious interest in establishing an economy of means and as such is the antithesis of the 2008 Olympic stadium in Beijing. But while that's an achievement, it's not an architectural achievement. In design terms what we're looking at is pretty underwhelming." He went on to criticise the procurement and design processes – stating of the latter that it should have been subject to an architectural competition. This view was echoed by Tom Dyckhoff, The Times's architecture critic, who described the design as "tragically underwhelming" and commented that the "architecture of the 2008 and 2012 Olympics will, in years to come, be seen by historians as a "cunning indicator of the decline of the West and the rise of the East". Piers Gough, Amanda Levete and Charles Jencks noted in the Guardian that "it's an Ikea stadium." Continuing they note that this stadium does not take your breath away. "Beijing's Bird's Nest stadium was the icon for the Olympics in China and that is what we are missing. It is not going to capture anyone's imagination and does not hold the iconography of the moment." They admired the stadium for its simplicity and economy. Amanda Baillieu writing in Building Design challenged the designer's claims that the stadium is environmentally sustainable and good value for money. Instead, it is asserted that the reality will be the opposite. Noting that the roof and the seats could not be reused.

Rowan Moore noted that the stadium was the perfect model of an austere structure for austere times, if it had not had cost £486m. The Olympic Stadium was nominated for the 2012 Stirling Prize in architecture losing out to the Sainsbury Laboratory at the University of Cambridge.

== Post-Olympic Games use ==
The legacy plan for the stadium had involved converting it into a 25,000 to 30,000-seat athletics stadium with a sports training, science and medicine centre after the 2012 games. It was noted by a culture media and sports committee in 2006 that London needed world-class athletics stadium once the games had finished; as Crystal Palace needed huge investment to bring it up to the standard required since athletics was not built into Wembley stadium. The committee saw benefit in a football or rugby club using the stadium as its home ground, provided that athletics events were accommodated.

Before London's bid for the Olympic Games was successful it was thought that football clubs West Ham United or Tottenham Hotspur could move into the stadium after the games. However Mayor Livingstone ruled this out stating that it would be scaled down to around 25,000 seats for an athletics facility and would not be turned into a football ground. By 2006 Olympic organisers stated that West Ham could takeover the stadium with the athletics track in situ. The keeping of the athletics track put Tottenham off the stadium.

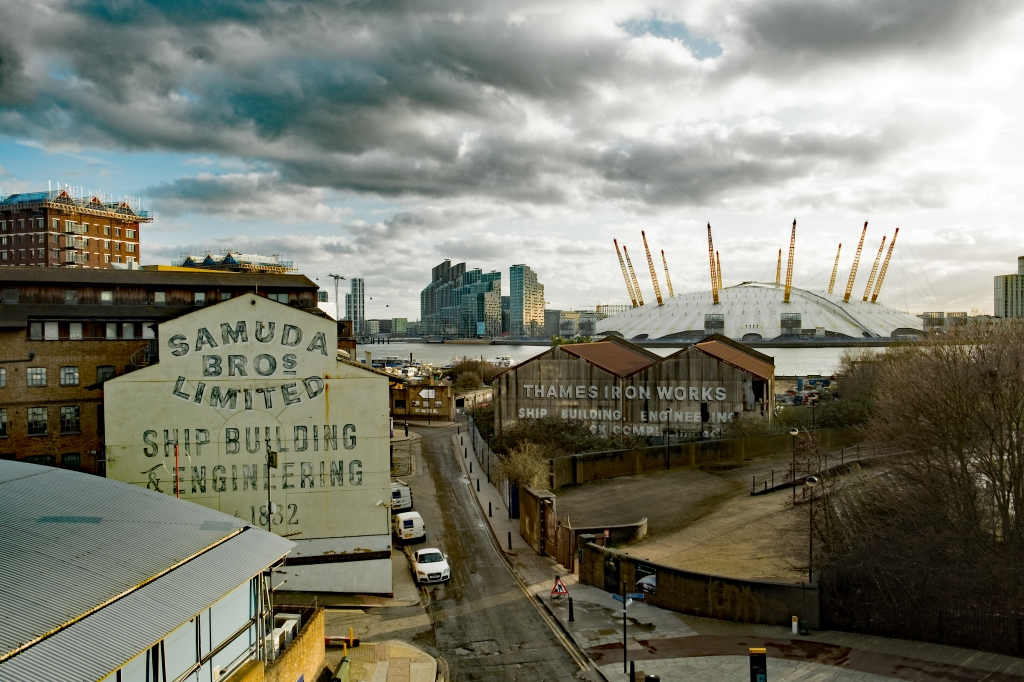
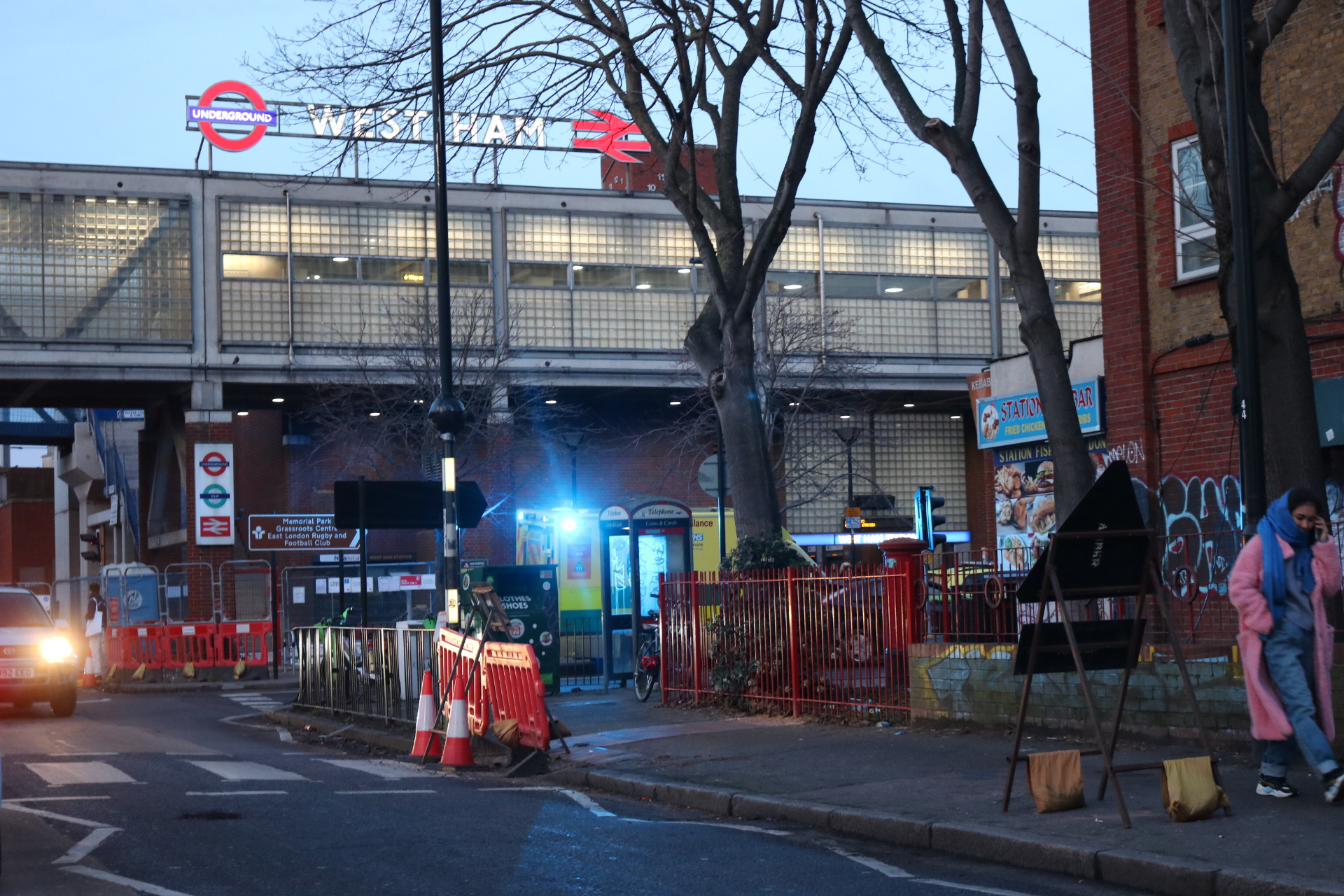
Thames Ironwork site and land near West Ham station were proposed locations for West Ham's new stadium

In 2007 Leyton Orient were in discussions to move into the stadium as the plan was still to scale the stadium down and the club were a suitable size to move into it. West Ham's request for the stadium was turned down, despite the club reportedly offering the authorities £100m to reduce the 80,000-seat stadium to 60,000 after the 2012 Games; as it would not be possible deliver the stadium on time and budget for the games due to the number of design changes required by the club. Alternative sites for a new stadium included Thames Ironworks and land next to West Ham station were considered by the club and the London Development Agency (LDA). The Olympic board was made up by the government, the mayor of London and the Olympic Delivery Authority and focused on legacy planning for the stadium. In February 2012 former Sports Minister Richard Caborn, who was a member of the board at the time, noted that other board members were keen to begin construction work on the original design and avoid another Wembley-style embarrassment. Caborn further noted that not planning for a genuine dual use stadium such like the Stade de France was a missed opportunity. Talks with football clubs were abandoned in 2007 and not picked up again until 2010.

In 2008 Boris Johnson became Mayor of London, and stated that the stadium could be used for football and wanted to revisit the post games plans to downsize. The London Assembly's economic development, culture, sport and tourism committee warned that the stadium would struggle to be financially viable in July 2009. The committee later stated that the decision to downsize the stadium to 25,000 seats instead of 60,000 as flawed and not in the long-term interests of taxpayer. The Olympic Park Legacy Company (OPLC) was established as a public sector, not-for-profit Company limited set up by the Mayor of London, Secretary of State for Communities and Local Government, and the Minister for the Olympics in 2009. The aim of the company was to carry on the work started by the LDA, which had acquired the land, and worked on post 2012 legacy. The company chaired by Baroness Ford wanted to review the size of the stadium post 2012.

=== First tenancy process ===
In March 2010 the OPLC prepared a tender process for interested parties to compete for the stadium, with the winner owning the stadium. Chairwoman Baroness Ford said the process would start with three months of market testing, including publication of an OPLC prospectus inviting people to make suggestions on what they can do with the stadium. Following which a procurement process would then take place for the future of the stadium. The OPLC set five criteria: that the new tenant should produce a viable long-term solution that provided value for money, secure a partner with the expertise to operate a legacy solution, reopen the stadium as quickly as possible, allow flexible usage, and make the stadium a distinctive physical symbol that supported regeneration.

Media speculation and expressions of interest included: the England and Wales Cricket Board and Kent County Cricket Club; Middlesex County Cricket Club, Essex County Cricket Club: Wasps RFC; Saracens R.F.C.; London Skolars R.L.F.C.; Major League Baseball; and the National Football League. After receiving and pre-screening over 100 expressions of interest, the formal bidding process of selecting the post-Olympics user of the stadium opened on 18 August 2010. It ran until midday on 30 September and the OPLC hoped to select a tenant by March 2011.

On 12 November 2010, it was announced that two bids had been shortlisted for the future use of the stadium, with whom final negotiations would take place. A joint bid from Tottenham Hotspur and Anschutz Entertainment Group (AEG), and a second bid from West Ham United and Newham Council was selected. The only other bid received by the OPLC came from a consortium formed by International Stadia Group, HKS and CB Richard Ellis and was not shortlisted.

At the opening of the formal bid process, West Ham United were considered favourites once they withdrew their initial opposition to keeping the running track in place. The club planned a £100 million conversion to create a 66,000 capacity venue, which would also host international football, international athletics, as well as Essex County Cricket Club, international Twenty20 cricket matches, NFL games, and Live Nation events. Whereas Tottenham proposed knocking the stadium down and rebuilding it as a football only venue. The scheme also would refurbish Crystal Palace for athletics. In 2017 Moore Stephens conducted an Olympic Stadium Review and noted that West Ham's bid ticked all five of the requirements set out by the OPLC whereas Tottenham's only met three of them.

=== Decision, review, and cancellation ===
In January 2011 Newham Council approved a £40 million Treasury loan at favourable rates to allow West Ham to finance a move to the stadium. This was despite one financial auditor stating that the way the decision came about was open to abuse and councillors asking why were they providing a loan for a private company. On 11 February 2011, the OPLC unanimously selected West Ham United and Newham Council as the preferred bidders to take over the stadium after the 2012 Games. The decision was ratified by the British Government and London Mayor Boris Johnson on 3 March 2011.

The OPLC announced on 5 July 2011 that an independent review into the awarding of the Olympic Stadium to West Ham United was to be conducted. The Times had found that the director of services, Dionne Knight, had been engaged by West Ham United to carry out consultancy work without the permission of the OPLC. West Ham responded with legal action against Tottenham Hotspur and The Sunday Times due to how the information was obtained. The club and the OPLC stated that Knight had no involvement in the vote to award the stadium. In August 2011, Moore Stephens' investigation and a separate West Ham investigation led by a Blackstone Chambers barrister ruled that the process was not compromised and the bid process would not be reopened. West Ham and the OPLC made complaints to the police and Operation Polworth was conducted in August 2011 following allegations relating to the unlawful obtaining of information. It was revealed that the information was received by people working on behalf of PKF, who were employed by Tottenham to assist with their bid for the stadium. Both PKF and Tottenham stated they did not know about the activity. The three men were fined a total of £123,250 between them after pleading guilty to obtaining personal data contrary to the Data Protection Act 1998 in 2013.

Leyton Orient, who are geographically the nearest professional football club to London Stadium, complained that as it was so close to their own ground, West Ham's occupancy of it would breach F.A. rules and could even force them into bankruptcy. Tottenham Hotspur and Leyton Orient applied for a judicial review to overturn the OPLC's decision; however, this appeal was rejected in June 2011. Tottenham Hotspur appealed the decision not to have a review on 29 June 2011. On 23 August, the day before Tottenham Hotspur were due in court, they staged "intense negotiations" with the office of the Mayor of London, and looked set to drop all claims for a review and be offered funding for their own stadium. However, the next day Tottenham did attend court with Leyton Orient and won a review of the decision, being told that they had an arguable case specifically in regards to the £40m loan by Newham Council giving an unfair advantage through state aid or through state resources". On 17 October 2011, a day before they were due in court for the judicial review into the bidding process of the stadium, Tottenham Hotspur and Leyton Orient ended their legal challenge.

The award of the stadium to West Ham was cancelled on 11 October 2011, as the OPLC the concluded that the Olympic Stadium would remain in public ownership and that it would be leased out to an anchor tenant. This came after concerns around Legal challenges and a complaint to the European Commission over state aid, would have led to the stadium sitting empty for years. The London Borough of Newham withdrew from the West Ham bid and intended to contribute to the funding of the Stadium with the OPLC.

=== Second tenancy process ===
A new process to select an anchor tenant begun with the athletics legacy clause was clarified to ensure that a track remained in the stadium with the stadium scaled to 60,000 seats was launched in December 2011. The OPLC set out four criteria for the stadium. 1) To deliver a viable, long-term, multi-use stadium that is deliverable and provides value for money.2) To re-open the stadium for operational use from 2014. 3) To re-open the stadium with an athletics track. 4) To allow flexible usage of the stadium by OPLC, tenants and other bodies, allowing year-round community access.

In February 2012, 16 parties were interested in the stadium. Essex County Cricket Club along with the University of East London decided to make a bid for the stadium, but the university pulled out of the process. Four bidders for the stadium were announced in July 2012:

- West Ham United move into the stadium and use for football matches.
- Intelligent Transport Services proposed a Formula One race taking place at the Olympic Park which would include a section of the track inside the Stadium.
- University College of Football Business (UCFB) proposed a 20-year lease for office, media and hospitality facilities.
- Leyton Orient move into the stadium and use for football matches.

In 2017 Moore Stephens conducted an Olympic Stadium Review and noted that Leyton Orient's was the same as West Ham's but offered weaker financial outcomes. The bid from Intelligent Transport Services, was rejected for having too much speculation and uncertainty in their business plan and in Moore Stephens view limited legacy. Additionally they noted that the bid from the university of Football would not be an appropriate use to guarantee regular use of the Stadium and it offered a limited legacy.

In April 2012, the Olympic Park Legacy Company was dismantled, and responsibilities transferred to the newly constituted London Legacy Development Corporation (LLDC). In December 2012, West Ham were named as the preferred bidder by the LLDC to be anchor tenants for the stadium with a separate operator co-ordinating community and sporting use, as well as concerts and events. West Ham, reportedly, agreed to pay £2.5 million in rent per year to the LLDC and promised to pay back any extra cost for the roof and seats within ten years.

On 22 March 2013, West Ham United secured a 99-year lease deal, with the stadium planned to be used as their home ground from the 2016–17 season. In July 2013, UK Athletics received a 50-year deal for the use of the stadium. UK Athletics will have access every year from the last Friday in June until the end of July.

With so much public money going into the stadium and its redevelopment, the BBC learned that David Gold and David Sullivan must share any profits they make if they sell the club. Daniel Kretinsky took a 27 per cent stake of West Ham in 2021, and the club had to pay £6.5 million to E20 Stadium as part of the agreement for use of the stadium in 2023. However £3.6m was returned to West Ham in January 2025 after a judge ruled that "manifest errors" in an "expert determination" relating to the increase in the club's valuation after Krestinsky had purchased. West Ham had originally paid £2.6m before the LLDC demanded more.

In May 2014 it was announced that Essex Cricket Club had agreed to a deal "in principle" for a two-week festival of Twenty20 cricket matches at the stadium from 2016. In 2016 it was stated that it was more likely to be held from 2018 using a drop in pitch. The venue was also touted as a possible venue for the 2019 Cricket World Cup. However, the venue was not included in the final fixtures list. It was not chosen due to the existing facilities running east to west which would have made the game difficult to watch, due to the setting sun, as at most cricket venues the pitch runs from north to south. Additionally, it was discovered that the capacity of the stadium would decrease by 30,000 if the facilities were reconfigured to a north–south alignment. The International Cricket Council also had concerns over potential injuries to players caused by the raised sand-based outfield.

== Response to lease ==
Following the appointment of West Ham as tenants Barry Hearn stated that he would mount another legal challenge as he believed the rules set out by the LLDC had not been followed and felt that Leyton Orient's proposed groundshare had been ignored. On 19 September 2013, Leyton Orient lost their bid to win a judicial review with judge Clive Lewis stating that the LLDC was entitled to make the decision which was not "irrational". In November 2013, it was the House of Lords' opinion that Leyton Orient should be allowed occasional use of the stadium. In early December, the LLDC said that there was nothing to stop Orient from negotiating a rental agreement with whichever firm ends up running the stadium. Orient, however, would not be able to negotiate a 99-year deal like West Ham and would only have usage of the stadium when they were not playing. On 1 July 2014, Leyton Orient brought an end to their dispute with the Premier League. They had disputed the validity of the Premier League's decision to allow West Ham to move to the stadium; but as Orient would be able to consult with the stadium operators over using the venue for matches of their own they dropped the claims.

Supporters of 14 different football clubs, formed an Olympic Stadium Coalition, pressed for an inquiry into the LLDC's granting of West Ham's tenancy. They argued that West Ham were being given an unfair advantage by the arrangement, implying that the club had received state aid. However, in September 2015 the government rejected holding such an inquiry. In October 2015, the LLDC released a 207-page document with redacted sections. West Ham's annual rent was not revealed as this was seen to be commercially sensitive information. On 14 April 2016, after a tribunal forced the LLDC to publish the agreement in full it was revealed that West Ham will pay £2.5 million per year during a 99-year lease of the stadium but will not have to fund police, stewarding, heating, pitch maintenance, or corner flags. Barry Hearn described the deal as one his dog could have bettered.

In September 2018, Lyn Garner, chief executive of the LLDC, revealed that the £2.5m paid per year by West Ham did not even cover the cost of staging matches leading to increased debts in running the stadium for the 97-year remainder of their tenancy agreement. E20 and West Ham became embroiled in a protracted legal dispute in the High Court as to which elements of service were included in the annual payments under the 99-year lease, and which elements might be expected to involve an additional regular facility fee. Both parties, in November 2018, agreed to an out-of-court settlement. E20 Stadium and LLDC sued Allen & Overy law firm for professional negligence in its role drafting the London Stadium concession agreement with West Ham which was settled in August 2022. The LLDC stated that being unable to charge West Ham during their Europa Conference League campaign was further proof of how poor the original deal was.

== Post-Olympic redevelopment ==
The initial idea was to have the stadium opened in 2014, following redevelopment. Dennis Hone, chief executive of the LLDC, revealed in November 2012 that the stadium would not reopen in 2014 and it would reopen in August 2015 instead. The E20 LLP, oversaw the redevelopment of the stadium into the only UK venue that is both UEFA Category 4 and World Athletics category 1 stadium. seating 66,000 spectators. West Ham contributed £15 million and Newham Council £40 million for the work to be carried out with the LLDC and the British Government making up the rest. The reconfiguration of the stadium saw work on a 84-metre (92 yd) transparent roof, corporate areas, toilets, concessions and retractable seating. The roof twice the size of the original one at 45,000sq metres, will cover every seat in the ground and improve the acoustics and spectator experience.

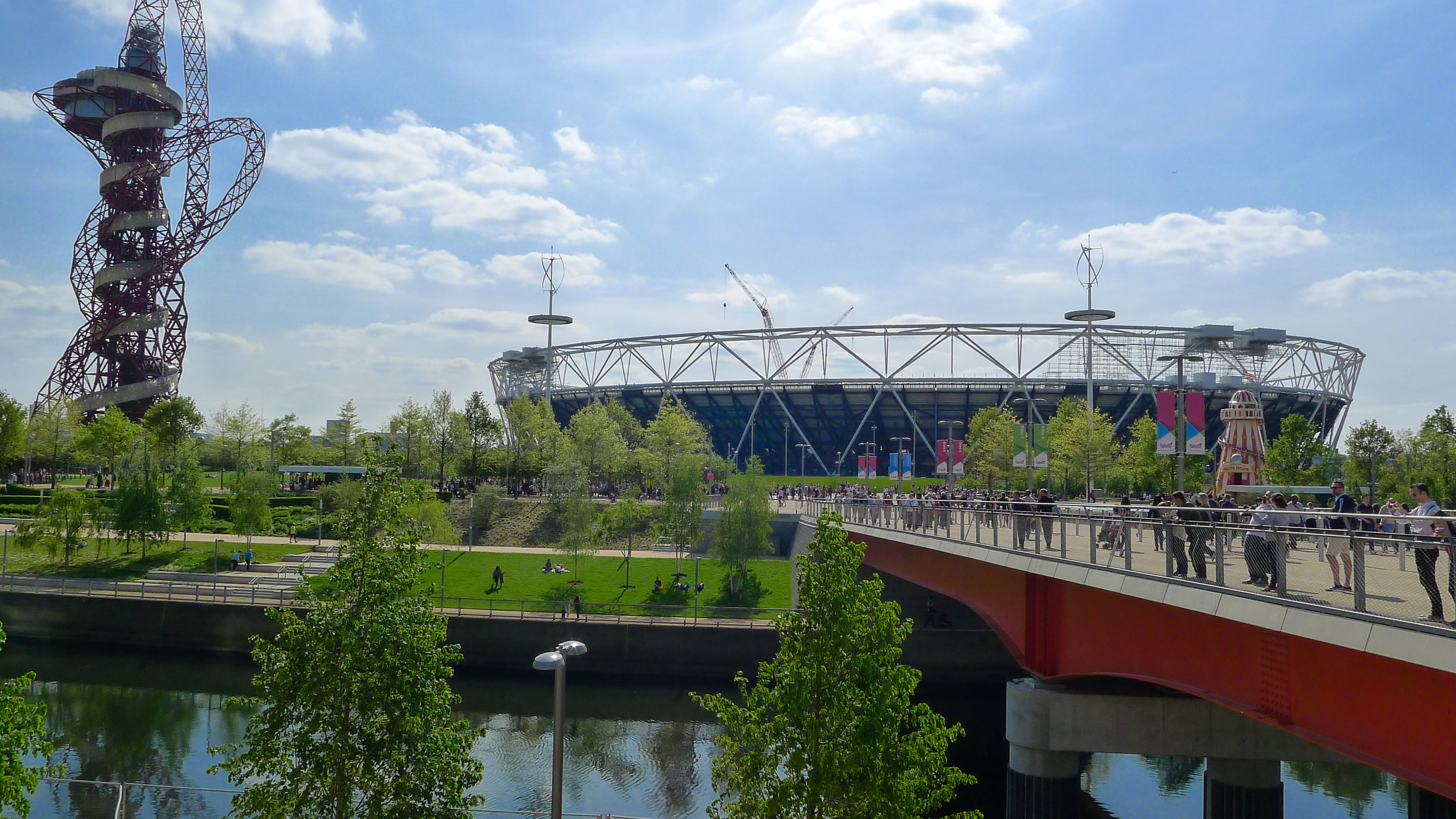
Olympic Stadium during its renovation, prior to the fitting of the roof and floodlights.

Balfour Beatty were initially contracted to construct the new roof for £41 million; in January 2014 they were awarded a £154 million tender, which includes the earlier contract for the roof, to complete the stadium's transformation works. Imtech G&H were awarded a £25 million contract to carry out electrical and plumbing work. Paul Kelso, working for Sky News, discovered in September 2014 that the cost of the conversion of the stadium may rise by £15 million, due to additional work to strengthen the structure, to allow it to support the new roof. It was revealed neither West Ham United nor the taxpayer would have to meet the additional cost as Balfour Beatty would contribute with the remainder funded from the existing LLDC transformation budget of the Olympic Park. In October 2014, the LLDC contributed a further £35.9 million towards the project with the funding coming from reserves and income generated by other means.

Work commenced on 13 August 2013 with the removal of 25,000 seats and the grass from the field of play. The athletics track was covered with a 75 cm (2 ft 6 in) layer of recycled concrete to protect it during the heavy lifting. In November 2013 work commenced to remove the fourteen floodlight panels as part of the £200 million conversion of the stadium. Work began on installing the 14 new floodlights in March 2015. Each floodlight panel is 18 metres (59 ft) tall and weighs 45 tonnes (44 long tons; 50 short tons), and sits 30 metres (98 ft) above the stadium's floor, suspended from the roof rather than sitting on top. As the floodlight work began, work on a steel halo structure that encircles the stadium, containing 96 turnstiles, catering and toilet facilities, concluded.

In 2024 planning permission was given for 6,500 square metres of solar membrane panels to be installed by Ameresco on the roof of the stadium. The LLDC Solar Membrane Project was the first to receive funding from the Mayor of London's Green Finance Fund in a form of a loan. London city had already contributed £45,000 towards a feasibility study and business case for the project. At a cost of £4.35 million this will allow the venue to generate enough energy to power all of the stadium's major events. These were installed in July 2025.

The original athletics Mondotrack FTX track surface was removed in May 2016 and a new surface, using 17,000 square metres (20,000 sq yd) of Mondotrack/WS track, was installed. The grass playing field was lengthened by several metres at either end for the 2015 rugby matches to fit a suitably-sized rugby/football pitch. The pitch at the stadium was replaced after the Olympic Games with a Desso GrassMaster artificial-natural hybrid pitch approved for Premier league matches of 105 by 68 metres (115 by 74 yd), along with under-soil heating.

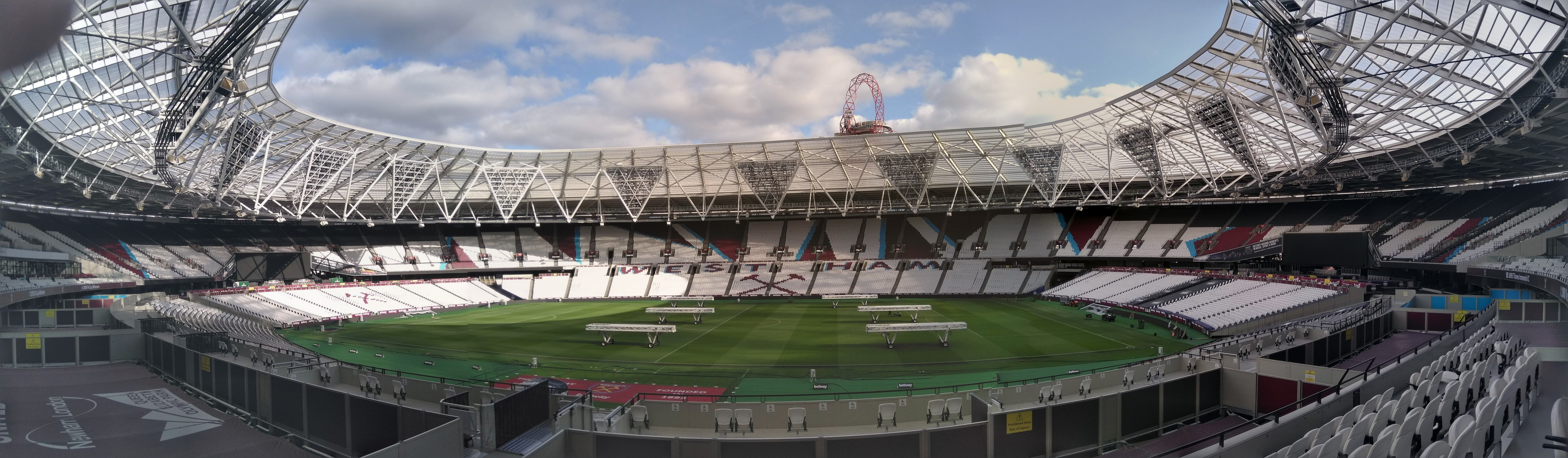
Panoramic picture of the interior of London Stadium

The black-and-white seating design from the Olympics was replaced with a white, blue and claret design. The new design includes West Ham's name on the East Kop Stand and symbolic crossed hammers on all lower-tier stands, and the retention of the 2012 shard design on the upper tier, albeit in new colouring to match the stadium's anchor tenant. Work continued through 2016 to transform the stadium into a home for West Ham, with the club's colours and giant model West Ham shirts added to the stadium concourse. A West Ham store and coffee shop was opened on 23 June.

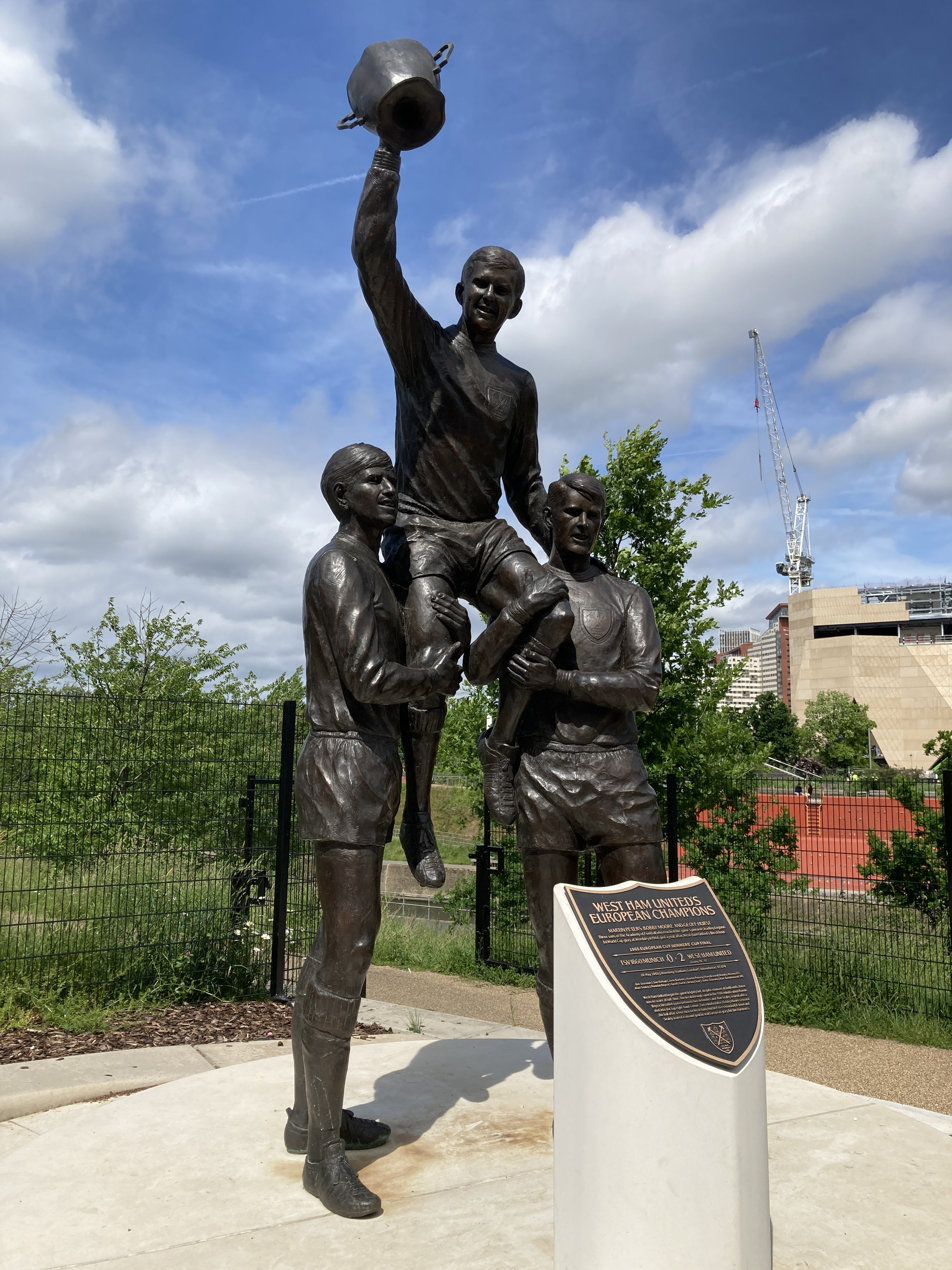
West Ham United's European Champions statue outside of the stadium.

In an attempt to make London Stadium more like their home ground, in April 2019 a £250,000 claret-coloured pitch surround was announced and installed. The colour of the carpet, over the athletics track surrounding the pitch, was at the centre of a long running dispute between the club and LLDC. An agreement on the carpet was met as one of the conditions to avoid a court case, with West Ham paying an increased rent and also being allowed to place a statue outside the stadium and to name a stand. The East Stand was chosen to be renamed in honour of Billy Bonds. A statue of Bobby Moore, Geoff Hurst and Martin Peters known as "West Ham United's European Champions" picturing the 1965 European Cup Winners' Cup was installed outside the Stadium in 2021 in an area known as Champions Place. Peters' ashes were placed in the foundation of the statue.

In February 2020, West Ham announced planned alterations to the stadium introducing two new lower-tier stands moving supporters closer to the pitch, many by more than four metres (13 feet). In March 2020, West Ham opened a sensory room in the stadium for fans. On 6 April 2022, West Ham announced that the capacity for football matches would be increased to 62,500 and the lower tier of the west stand is to be reconfigured to make the stadium more football-oriented. The redevelopment meant an increase of the overall capacity to 68,013.

=== Community track ===
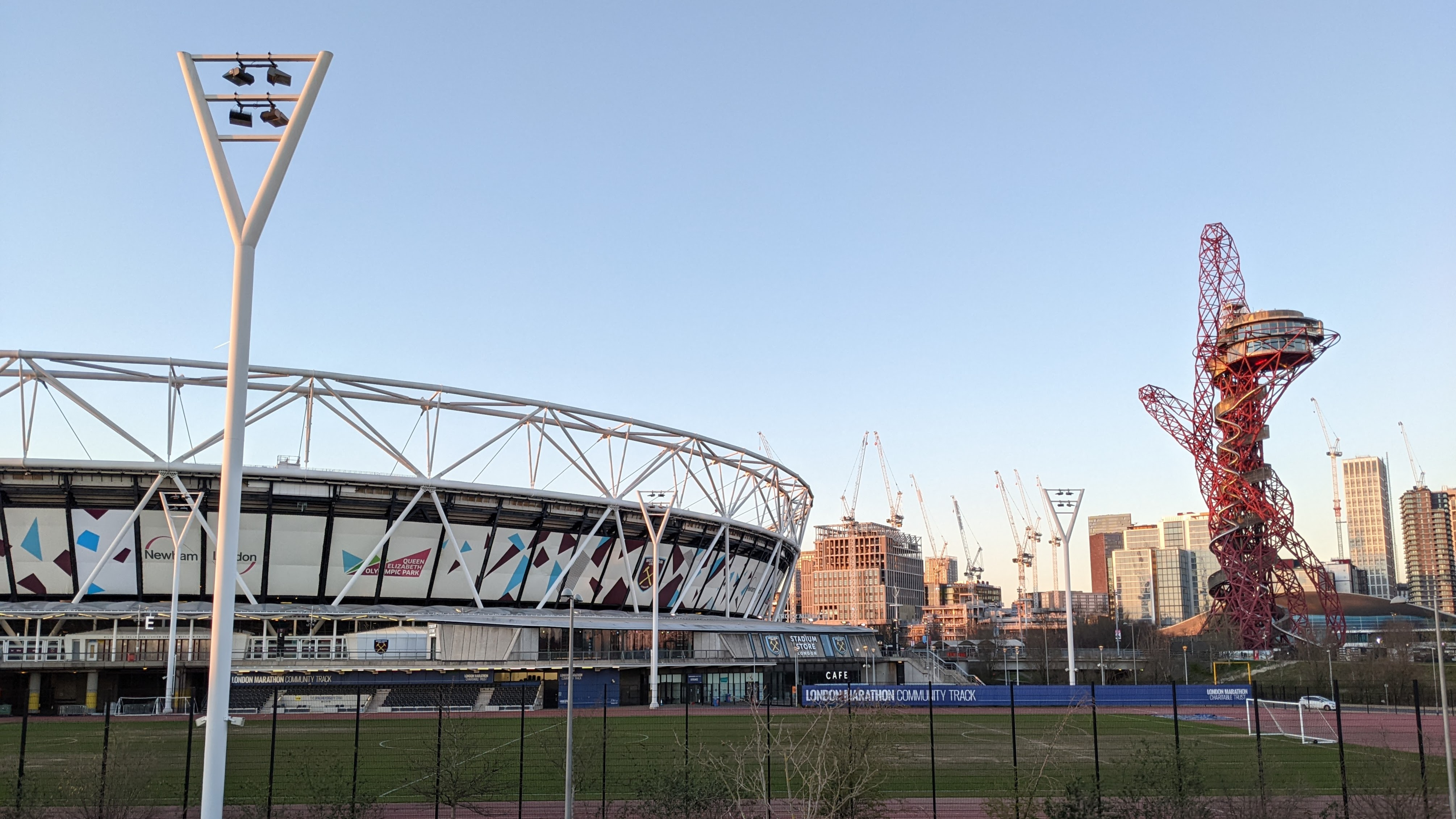
Community track next to the stadium.

Following the demolition of the 2012 warm-up track as the land it was on was given to Crossrail; a permanent athletics six-lane track (eight-lane on the straights) was built to the north of the Greenway footpath, on the southside of the stadium. The construction of the track was funded by a grant from the London Marathon Trust. The grant was the biggest in the charity's history at that point and the stadium opened to the public in October 2017. The stadium has a grandstand named after Chris Brasher and John Disley, which can seat 200 people and a clubhouse.

The track allows the London Stadium to comply with IAAF rules at Category 1 facilities and is home to Newham and Essex Beagles Athletic Club. Altis FC have also made the stadium their home along with use by the Bobby Moore Academy.

=== Stadium issues ===
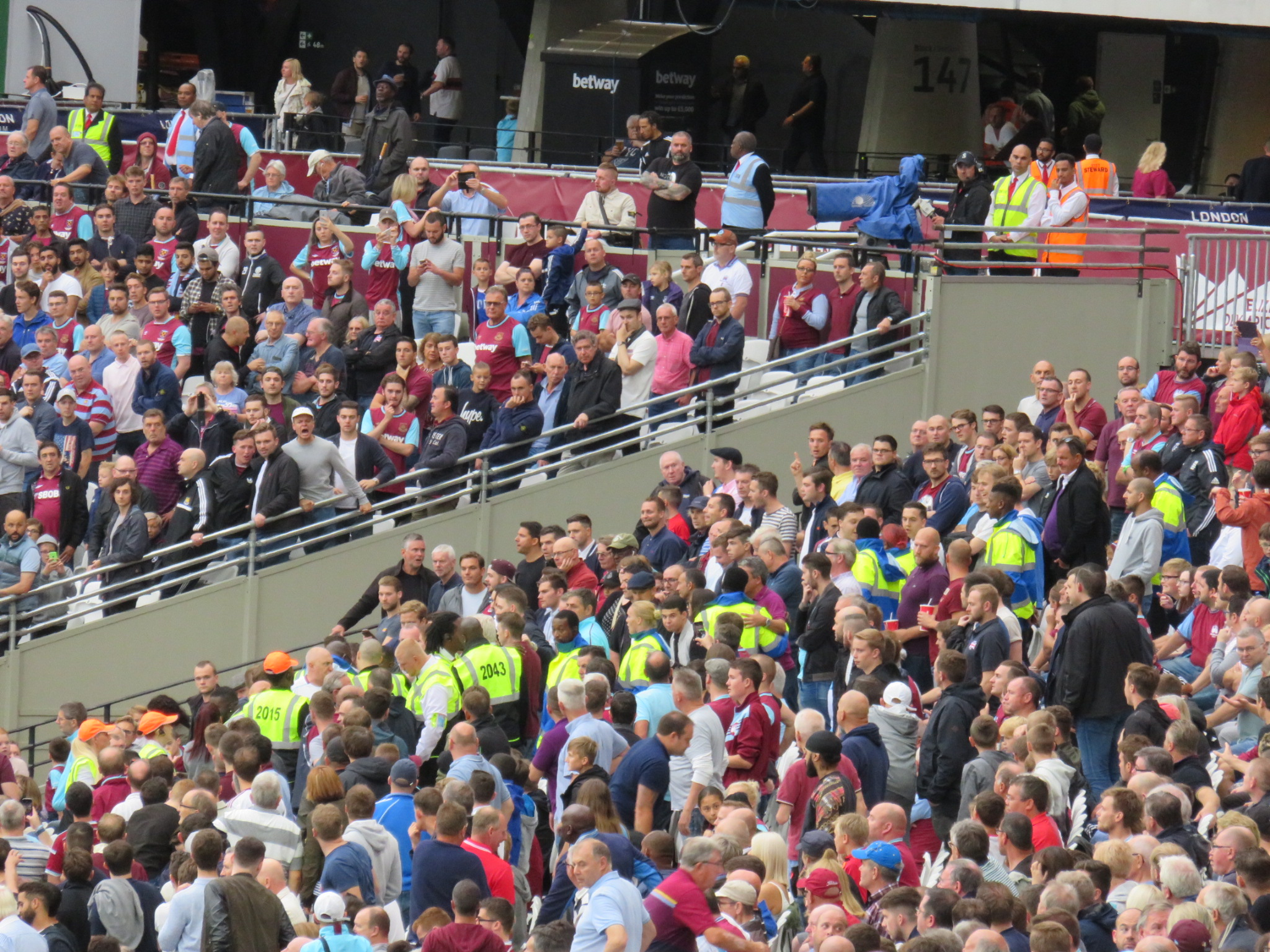
Stewards (in yellow jackets) within a group of West Ham United supporters

At the Samoa v Barbarians Rugby match spectators complained about the lack of Wi-Fi and beer at the stadium along with long queues for tickets, poor views and some seats already been allocated. There was also an issue around seats being allocated during the West Ham v Bournemouth match. Football stadium design expert, Paul Fletcher thought that the stadium should be demolished as the stadium's design means football fans are too far from the pitch.

At the beginning of the 2016–17 season, West Ham's games were marred by instances of crowd trouble. Disturbances occurred in matches against Bournemouth, Watford and Middlesbrough at the stadium, leading to the club to ask E20 to ensure that there was a police presence at the venue. The police turned down the request stating that there was not a satisfactory radio system at the stadium. Further issues occurred in matches against Sunderland and Chelsea. This was despite enhanced security measures being deployed for the Chelsea match.

Measures were permanently put in place inside and outside of the stadium including creating more distance between opposing fans and strengthening barriers and ensuring segregation outside the stadium on the Island and having stewards with cameras.

In March 2018, there were protests against West Ham United owner, David Sullivan at the stadium during a 3–0 home defeat to Burnley. There were four pitch invasions and Sullivan was escorted from his seat before the end of the match. Sullivan was also hit on the head by a coin. Measures including increased security presence and preventing fans from approaching the area holding members of the West Ham board were announced in late March. The measures funded by the taxpayer cost £60,000 to implement.

In June 2018, West Ham were charged by the FA with offences relating to crowd disturbances at the game against Burnley in March. In January 2019, West Ham were fined £100,000 for the disturbances. The Football Association investigation of the incidents was heavily critical of the stadium operators, London Stadium 185 (LS185), and found that they had left sections which were damaging to the company out of their report. As LS185 were in control of the stadium's operations and were blamed for their actions in the disturbances (including cutting the number of stewards, poor training and unsatisfactory response to pitch invasions), West Ham sought to split the fine with the company.

== Events at the stadium ==
=== London 2012 ===
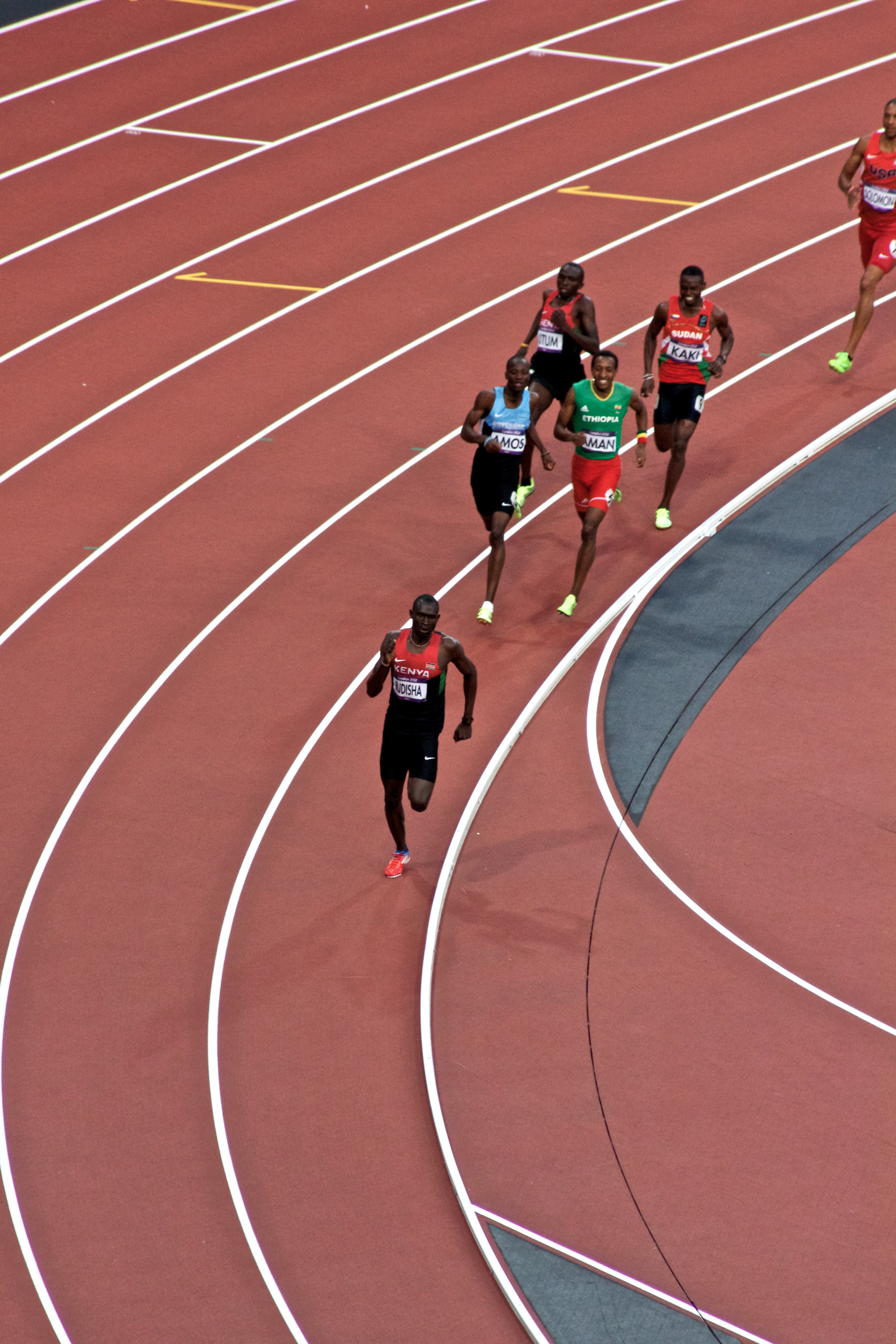
David Rudisha of Kenya setting a World Record for the 800 metres in the Olympic final.

The Olympic Stadium hosted its first public event on 31 March 2012, serving as the finish line for the National Lottery Olympic Park Run. Five thousand participants took part in a 5-mile (8 km) run around Olympic Park. On 5 May the stadium held "2012 Hours to Go: An Evening of Athletics and Entertainment". Niamh Clarke-Willis, a nine-year-old, was chosen to open the stadium ceremonially. The stadium hosted two warm-up events for the London 2012 Olympic and Paralympic Games as part of the London Prepares series. The venue hosted the British Universities Athletics Championships and the London Disability Grand Prix in May 2012.

During the London Disability Grand Prix, Paul Blake (T36, 1500 metres), Hannah Cockroft (T34, 100 metres), Michael McKillop (T37, 1500 metres), and Richard Whitehead (T42, 200 metres) all set new world records. The stadium also hosted the athletics events of the UK School Games.

The stadium hosted both the opening and closing ceremonies at the 2012 Olympic Games. During the four London 2012 ceremonies, the track was protected via synthetic covering. During the Athletics events of the Olympic Games, world records were set by David Rudisha for the 800 metres to become the first man to run the distance in under 1 minute 41 seconds. Jamaica men surpassed the 4 × 100 metres relay record from the 2011 World Championships by two-tenths of a second. The United States women's 4 × 100 metres team beat the previous best set by East Germany in 1985, recording a time of 40.82 seconds. Olympic records were set by Usain Bolt, who ran the second-fastest 100 metres, Renaud Lavillenie in the Pole vault by 1 cm (0.39 inches), Sally Pearson recorded a record time in the 100 metres hurdles and Tatyana Lysenko set a new mark in the Hammer.

The stadium also hosted both the opening and closing ceremonies of the 2012 Paralympic Games. Over the course of the Paralympic Games athletics events, world records were set on the track by; Oxana Boturchuk Martina Caironi, Chen Junfei, El Amin Chentouf, China, Libby Clegg, Arnu Fourie, Marie-Amelie le Fur, Terezinha Guilhermina, Mahmoud Khaldi, Samwel Mushai Kimani, Walid Ktila. Liang Yongbin, Rosemary Little, Liu Ping, Liu Wenjun, Gunther Matzinger, Michael McKillop, Mateusz Michalski, Yohansson Nascimento, Oscar Pistorius, David Prince, Evgenii Shvetcov, South Africa, Leo Pekka Tahti, Abraham Tarbei, Iurii Tsaruk, Richard Whitehead, Abderrahim Zhiou, Zhu Daqing, and Zhou Guohua. Multiple World Records on the track were set by Yunidis Castillo, Assia El Hannouni, Evan O'Hanlon, Jason Smyth, Fanie van der Merwe, and Marlou van Rhijn.

In the field events, world records were set by Hani Alnakhli, Alexey Ashapatov, Aigars Apinis Lahouari Bahlaz, Mohamed Berrahal, Kelly Cartwright, Yanlong Fu, Leonardo Diaz, Zeljko Dimitrijevic, Tanja Dragic, Najat El Garraa, Javad Hardani, Todd Hodgetts, Jun Wang, Maroua Ibrahmi, Juan Yao, Mohsen Kaedi, Mohammad Khalvandi, Gocha Khugaev, Karolina Kucharczyk, Assunta Legnante, Maciej Lepiato, Liu Fuliang, Drazenko Mitrovic, Azeddine Nouiri, Katarzyna Piekart, Mariia Pomazan, Nikita Prokhorov, Qing Wu, Markus Rehm, Raoua Tlili, Wang Yanzhang, Zhu Pengkai, and Oksana Zubkovska. Multiple records were set in the field by Dong Xia, Birgit Kober, Na Mi, Yang Liwan, and Wang Zhiming.

=== Athletics ===
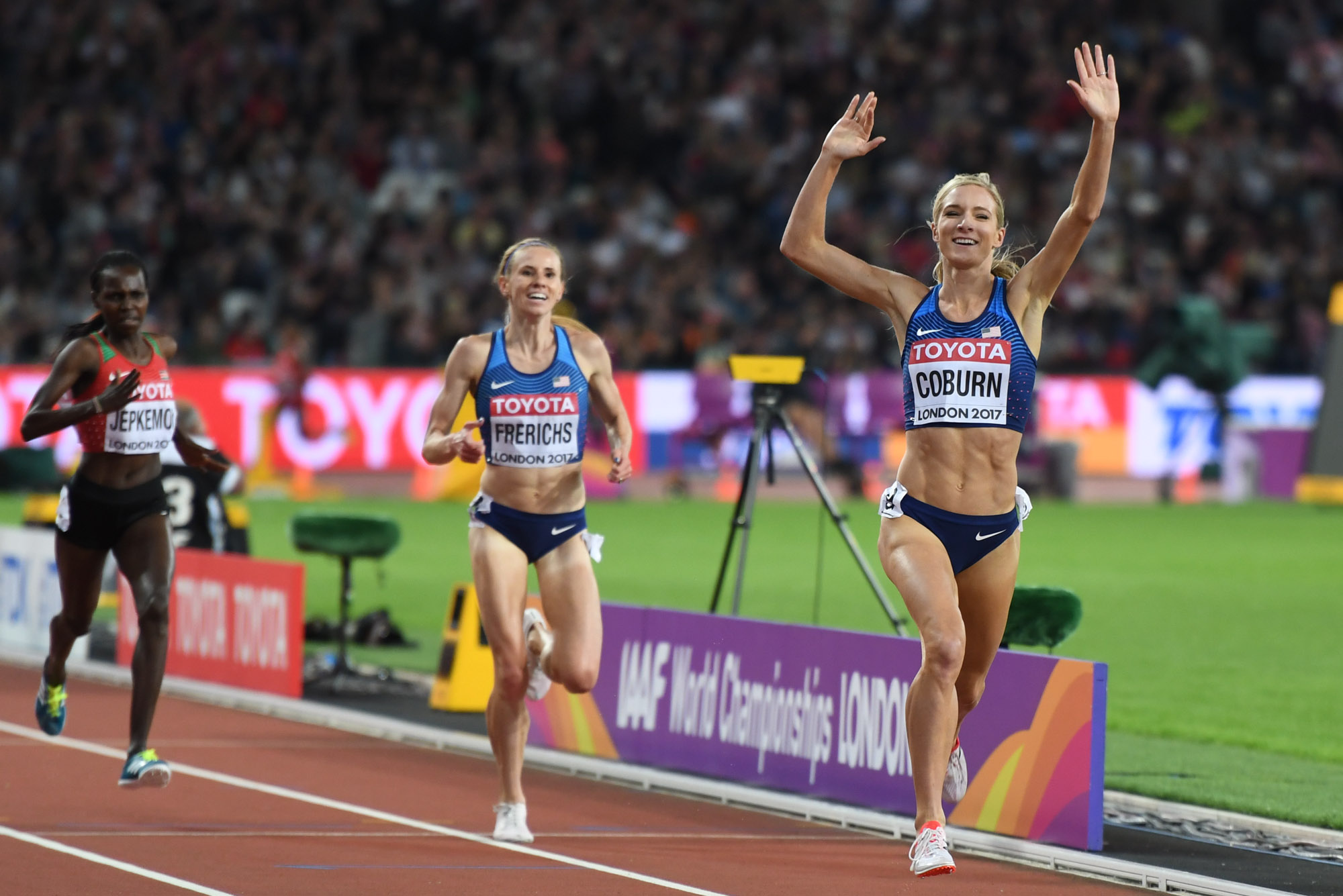
Emma Coburn set a World Championship record whilst winning the 3000m steeplechase.

London had bid to host the 2015 World Athletics Championships using the Olympic Stadium. The bid to host the event at the stadium was withdrawn, due to uncertainties arising out of who would operate it after the Olympics, as a number of plans for the stadium involved removing the athletics track. With issues resolved over keeping the athletics track in the stadium, London bid for the 2017 World Athletics Championships. The bid was supported by London's Mayor Boris Johnson and the British Government. On 11 November 2011, the IAAF awarded the 2017 World Championships to London. The World Para Athletics Championships were planned to take place a month before the able-bodied championships originally at the Alexander Stadium in Birmingham before being switched to the stadium.

At the championships Great Britain set a European record whilst winning the men's 4 × 100 m, while Emma Coburn set a championship record in the 3000m steeplechase. Rosângela Santos set a South American record in the 100m. An Asian record was set by Lyu Huihui in the javelin.

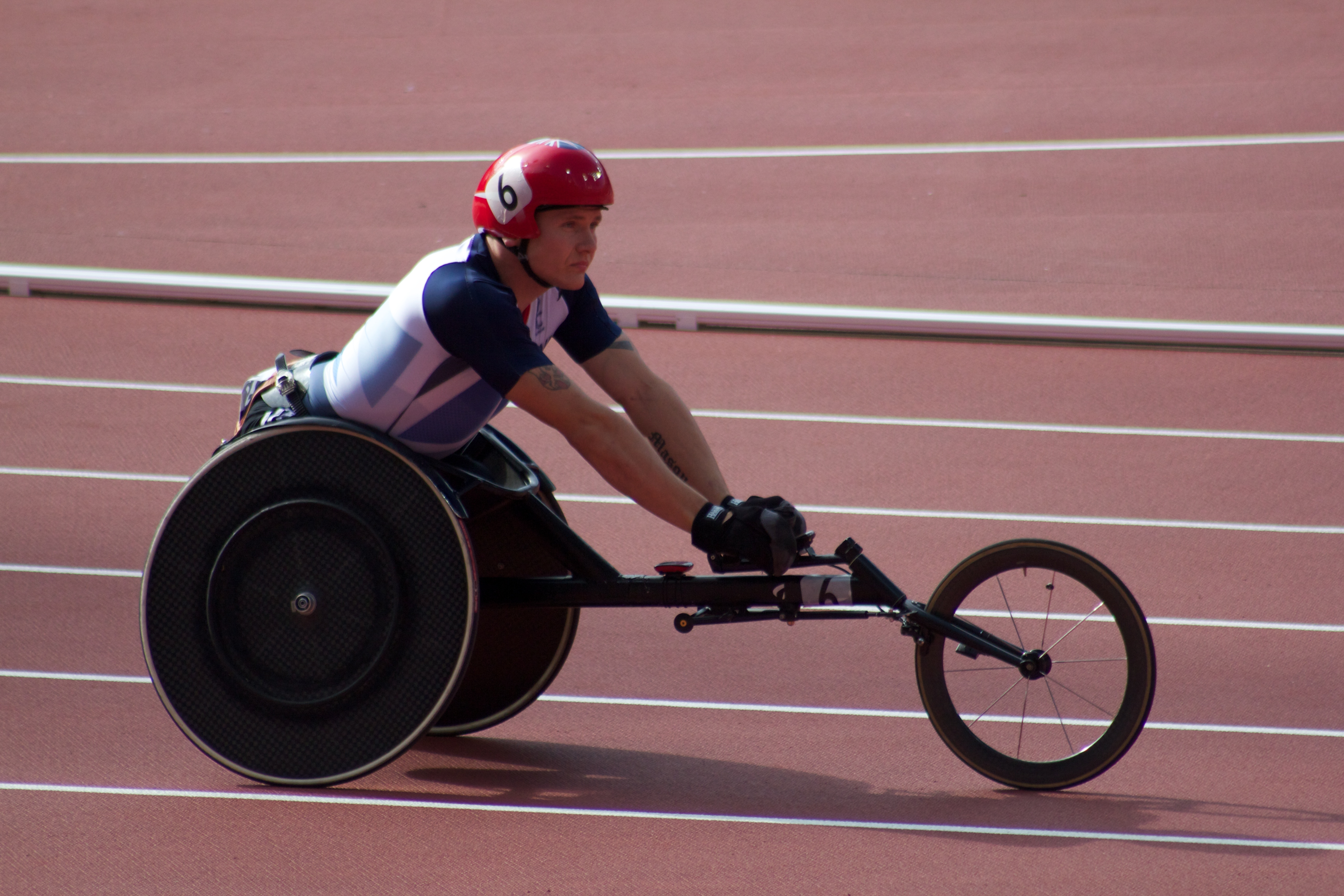
David Weir broke the World Record in the men's T54 mile

On 24 January 2013, it was confirmed that the London Athletics Grand Prix, a Diamond League event, would be switched to the stadium from Crystal Palace due to construction work on the stadium not commencing until 2014. In February 2013, it was announced that it would also hold a Paralympic athletics event on 28 July. Sainsbury's were announced as sponsors and the event was renamed the "Anniversary Games". The London Grand Prix was scheduled to move permanently to the stadium in 2016. However, due to the 2015 Rugby World Cup taking place in the stadium, using the original seating configuration. The meeting moved to the stadium a year early again under the name of the Anniversary Games.

In 2016 the IPC Grand Prix events were incorporated alongside Diamond League events on the second day of the meet. The 2017 Muller Anniversary Games was shortened to a one-day event on Sunday 9 July 2017. Before it returned to a two-day event in 2018. The 2020 event was scheduled to take place on the 4–5 July. However, the event was cancelled due to the COVID-19 pandemic. The 2021 event, scheduled to be reduced to a single day and take place on 13 July. As the meeting was the only event taking place that summer in the stadium, the LLDC paid UK Athletics to stage it elsewhere. After a three-year hiatus, the event returned to London Stadium as a single day event on 23 July 2023.

World records have been set at the meeting in the stadium by Tom Bosworth in the 3000 metres walk. Kendra Harrison broke the women's 100 m hurdles world record, a time which has existed for 28 years in 2016. Diamond League records have been set in the stadium by Nickisha Pryce in the 400 metres, Femke Bol in the 400 metres hurdles twice, and Sifan Hassan in mile. European records have been set in the stadium during the meetings by Matthew Hudson-Smith in the 400 metres, and Karsten Warholm in the 400 metres hurdles. Hassan has twice set the European record for the 5000 metres. The women's 100m African record was twice set by Blessing Okagbare. Asian records have been set by Zhenye Xie in the 200 meteres.

At the event, David Weir set a world record for the T54 mile. Georgina Hermitage (400 m T37) and Sophie Hahn (100 m T38) set world records. Kare Adenegan and Sophie Hahn set world record times in the T34 100 m and T38 200 m events.

The stadium had hosted the Great Newham London Run in 2015 and 2016 In February 2018, London Stadium was announced as the venue for the inaugural Athletics World Cup. The event was held on 14 and 15 July, and was won by the United States of America.

=== Football ===
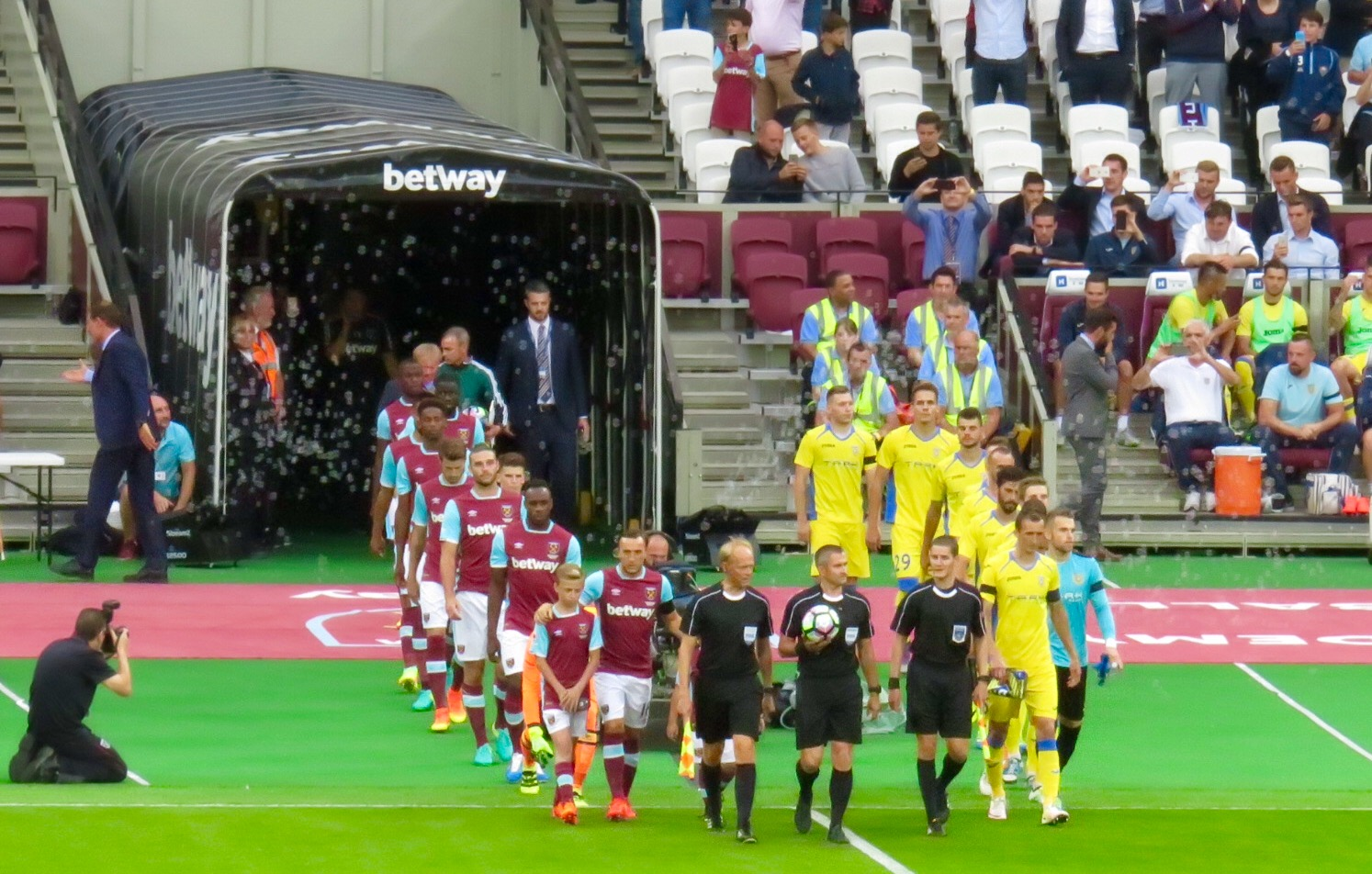
Players of West Ham United and NK Domžale before the game

West Ham United play at this stadium, having moved from their former Boleyn Ground in August 2016. The opening game for West Ham was a Europa League match against NK Domžale on 4 August 2016, which West Ham won 3–0 with the stadium sold out, albeit with a reduced capacity of 54,000 as conversion works were still being finished. The official opening match was a friendly with Juventus on 7 August with a 2–3 defeat. West Ham's first Premier League match at the stadium was against AFC Bournemouth with an attendance of 56,977. Watford were the first Premier League side to beat West Ham at London Stadium, overcoming a two-goal deficit to beat West Ham 4–2. The stadium's workers won the Premier League Grounds Team award for the 2024/25 season.

The 2021–22 National League play-off final to decide who wins promotion to the English Football League was held at the stadium as Wembley Stadium was unavailable. Grimsby Town F.C. defeated Solihull Moors F.C. 2–1 after extra time.

The stadium has hosted many charity football matches. It hosted the 2022 edition of Soccer Aid where a World XI defeated an England XI in a penalty shootout. It also hosted the 2023 Sidemen Charity Match on 9 September 2023. Sidemen defeated the YouTube all stars 8–5 with £2,425,855 being raised for charity. Sellebrity Soccer held an event in 2024 and 2025.

The stadium hosted its first ever international football match on 22 March 2024 between Spain and Colombia, drawing a crowd of 44,000.

=== Baseball ===
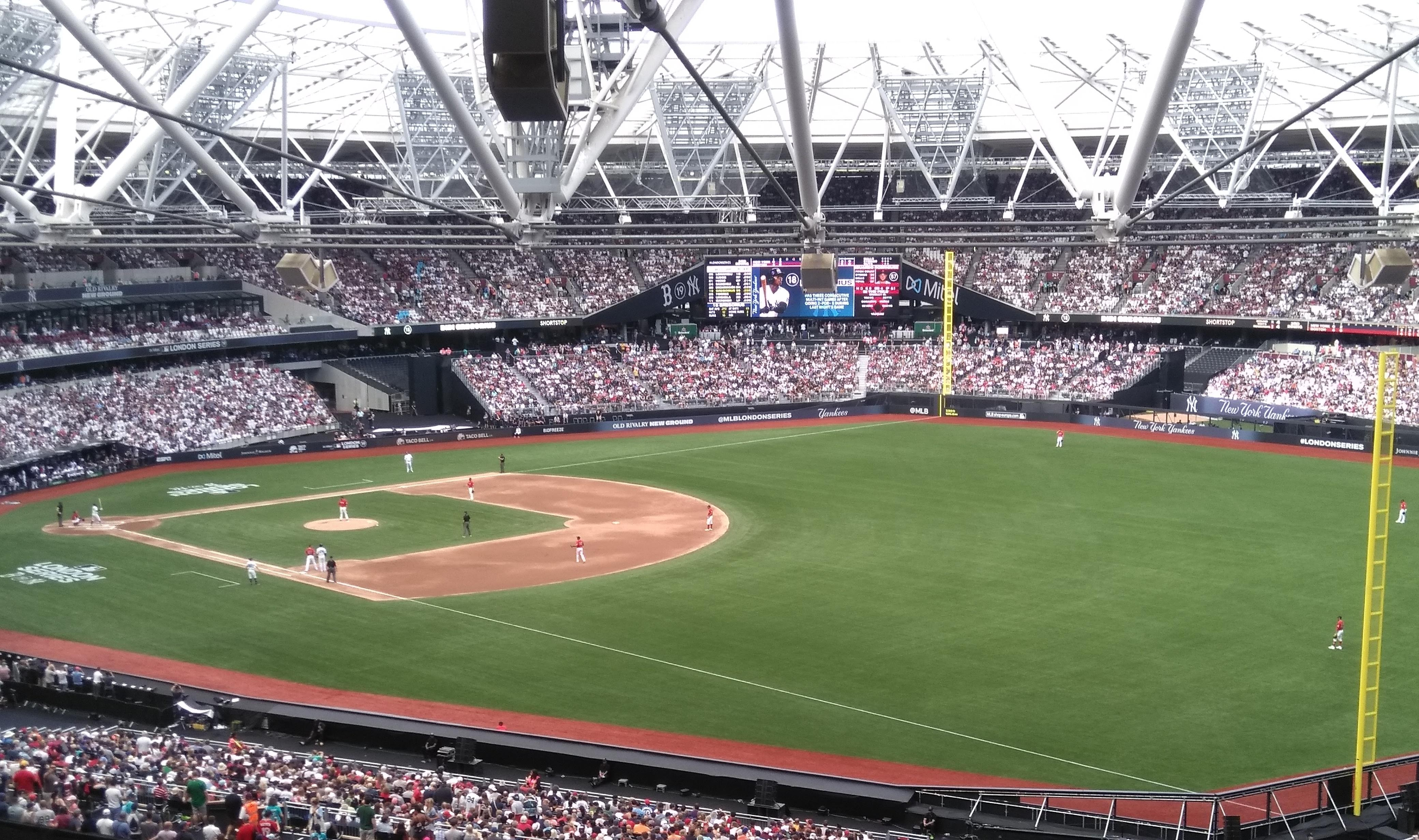
London Stadium in a baseball configuration for the 2019 MLB London Series.

On 8 May 2018, Major League Baseball announced a two-year deal to host a series of baseball games at London Stadium in 2019 and 2020. In its baseball configuration, London Stadium had a capacity of 66,000; plans were prepared to adjust the seating to emulate the "intimate" experience and amenities of American baseball stadiums, as well as constructing larger locker rooms akin to the clubhouses of U.S. parks. A new playing surface was overlaid on top of the stadium's existing grass.

The Boston Red Sox and New York Yankees played a two-game series at the stadium from 29 to 30 June 2019, the first MLB regular season games ever played in Europe. Branded as the 2019 MLB London Series, the Yankees won both games. Prior to the 2019 games, it was announced that the Chicago Cubs and St. Louis Cardinals would play games at the stadium in 2020; however, this series was cancelled as the result of the COVID-19 pandemic. The two teams did appear in 2023 when the London Series resumed, sharing the games. The deal was extended to have games in 2024 and 2026, but the latter games were cancelled in September 2025 due to logistical concerns.

=== Motorsport ===
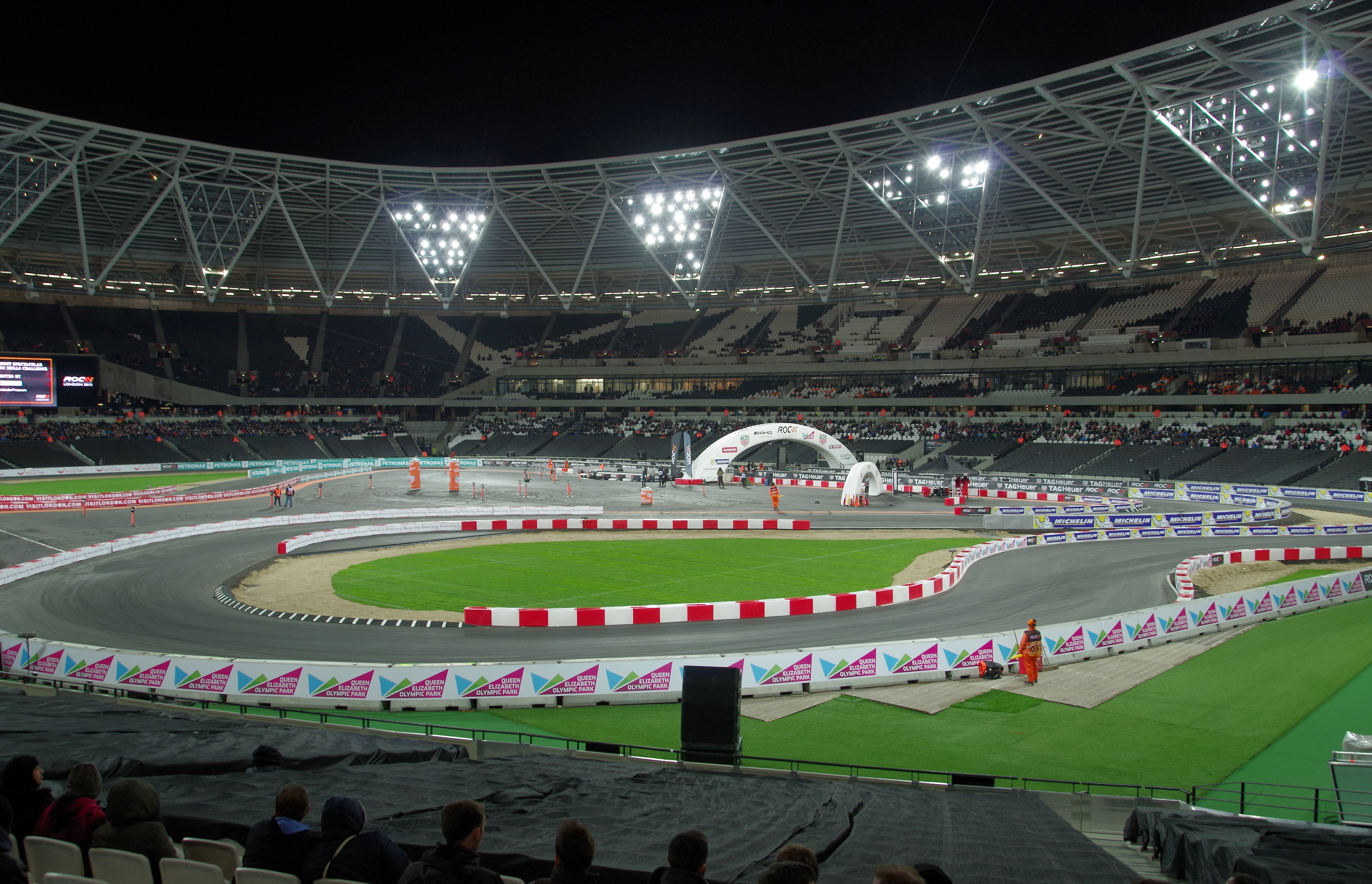
Race of Champions at the stadium.

In November 2015 the stadium hosted the 2015 Race of Champions event. It was the first occasion since 2008 that Great Britain hosted the event, with Wembley Stadium last staging the contest in the country. The English team of Andy Priaulx and Jason Plato won the nations cup whilst Sebastian Vettel took the Champion of Champions crown.

In 2022, 2023 and 2024 the stadium hosted Monster Jam. FIM World Supercross Championship was hosted for the first time in London at the stadium in 2025.

=== Rugby league ===
The first rugby league match at the stadium was played between the England national rugby league team and the New Zealand national rugby league team on 7 November 2015, it was the second test of a three-test series between the sides. The venue also hosted the match between England and Australia as part of the 2016 Rugby League Four Nations.

Test#	Date	Team 1	Score	Team 2	Attendance	Notes
1	7 November 2015	England	2–9	New Zealand	44,393	2015 Baskerville Shield
2	13 November 2016	England	18–36	Australia	35,569	2016 Four Nations

=== Rugby union ===
==== 2015 World Cup ====
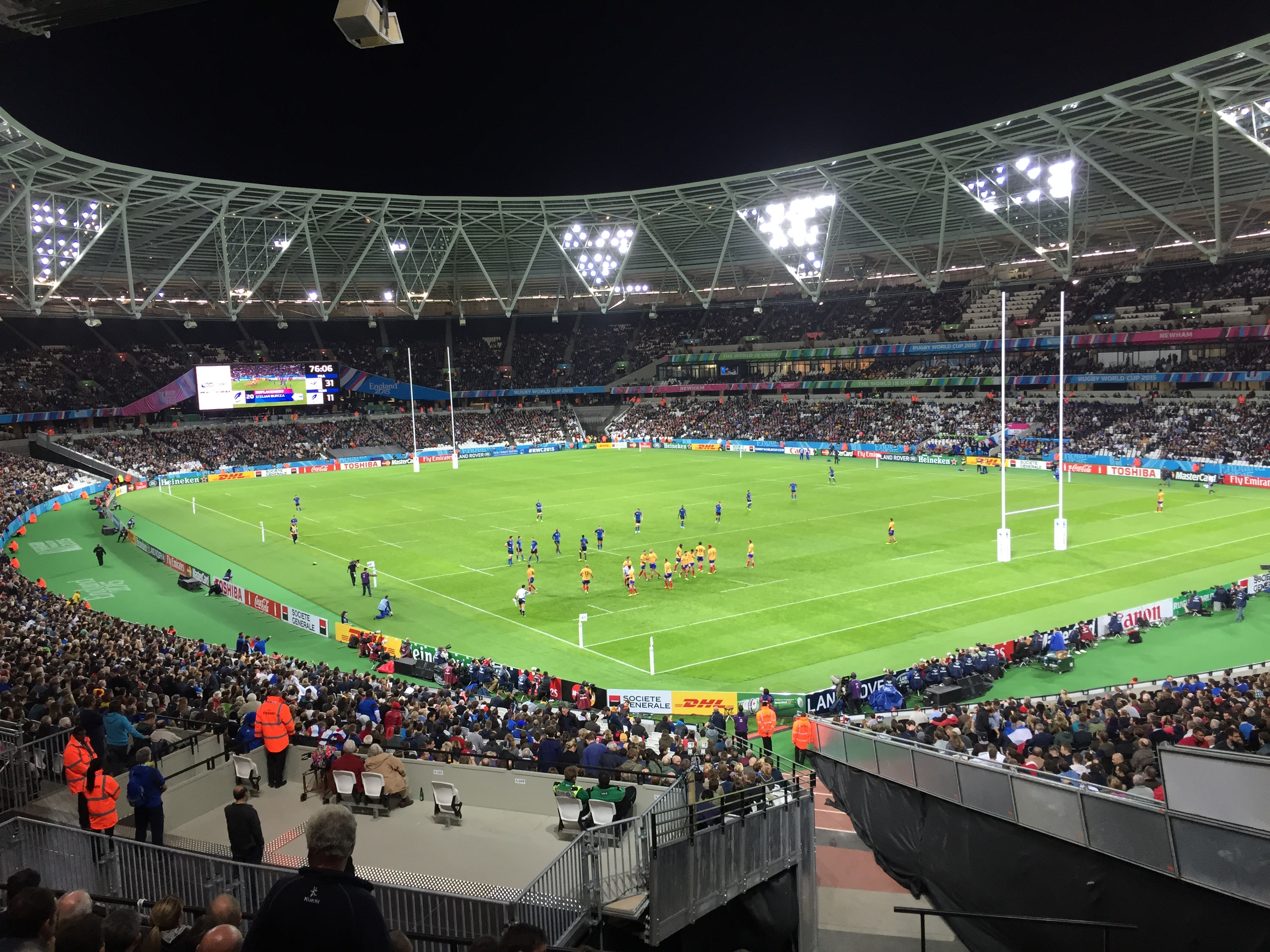
France playing Romania at the Olympic Stadium during the 2015 Rugby World Cup

In July 2012 the Olympic Park Legacy Company submitted a bid to England Rugby 2015 to host some matches of the 2015 Rugby World Cup. On 2 May 2013, it was announced that the Olympic Stadium was due to host four Pool matches during the World Cup and the Bronze final. The first rugby union match at the stadium took place on 29 August 2015 as part of a testing programme ahead of the World Cup. The match featured the first-ever game between the invitational Barbarians side and Samoa. The Barbarians won 27–24, with Samoa having Kane Thompson sent off for punching. The game was delayed when pitch sprinklers came on during the first half.

Date	Competition	Home team	Score	Away team	Attendance
29 August 2015	2015 Rugby World Cup Warm-up	Barbarians	27–24	Samoa	41,039
23 September 2015	2015 Rugby World Cup Pool D	France	38–11	Romania	50,626
24 September 2015	2015 Rugby World Cup Pool C	New Zealand	58–14	Namibia	51,820
4 October 2015	2015 Rugby World Cup Pool D	Ireland	16–9	Italy	53,187
7 October 2015	2015 Rugby World Cup Pool B	South Africa	64–0	United States	54,658
30 October 2015	2015 Rugby World Cup Bronze final	South Africa	24–13	Argentina	55,925

==== Premiership Rugby ====
At fixture launch on 7 July 2017, it was announced that Saracens would host their annual Derby Day clash against Harlequins at London Stadium on 24 March 2018. This was the first time since 2010 that this fixture did not take place at Wembley. The match ended in a 24–11 win for Saracens in front of a crowd of 55,329 and was the first-ever Premiership Rugby match at the stadium. The match was repeated in 2019 which ended as a 27–20 win for Saracens in front of a crowd of 42,717.

=== Concerts ===
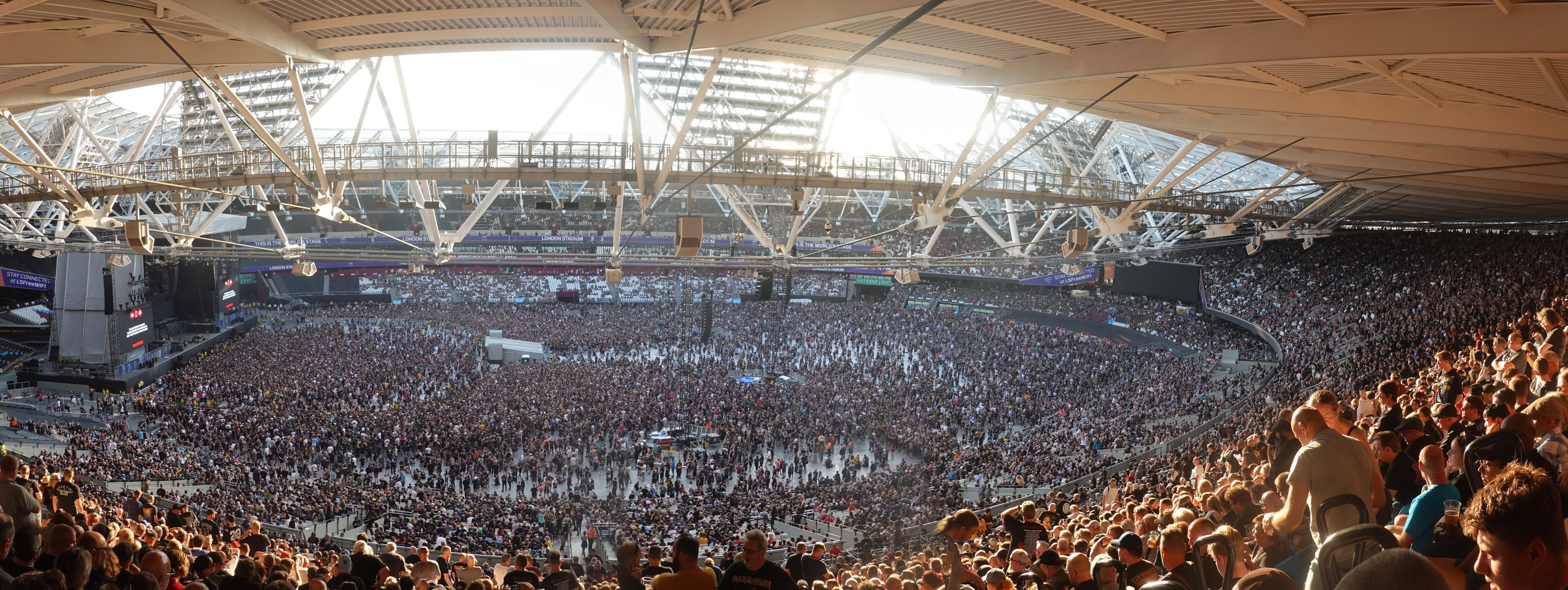
The London Stadium for Iron Maiden's "Run For Your Lives" tour

Since opening in 2016 the stadium has hosted a number of concerts, with Australian rock band AC/DC playing the first concert on the venue after the Olympic Games.

List of concerts showing date, headlining artist or band, name of concert or tour and opening acts
Date	Headlining Artist	Concert or Tour	Opening acts	Attendance
4 June 2016	AC/DC	Rock or Bust World Tour	Tyler Bryant & the Shakedown	
3 June 2017	Depeche Mode	Global Spirit Tour	The Horrors	65,191 / 65,191
16 June 2017	Guns N' Roses	Not in This Lifetime... Tour	The Kills; Tyler Bryant & the Shakedown	
17 June 2017	Guns N' Roses	Not in This Lifetime... Tour	The Kills; Tyler Bryant & the Shakedown	
23 June 2017	Robbie Williams	The Heavy Entertainment Show Tour	Erasure	
22 May 2018	The Rolling Stones	No Filter Tour	Liam Gallagher	
25 May 2018	The Rolling Stones	No Filter Tour	Florence and the Machine	
15 June 2018	Beyoncé & Jay-Z	On the Run II Tour	—N/a	126,443 / 126,443
16 June 2018	Beyoncé & Jay-Z	On the Run II Tour	—N/a	126,443 / 126,443
22 June 2018	Foo Fighters	Concrete and Gold Tour	Wolf Alice; Frank Carter & The Rattlesnakes	
23 June 2018	Foo Fighters	Concrete and Gold Tour	The Kills; Slaves; Starcrawlers	
1 June 2019	Muse	Simulation Theory World Tour	Tom Morello; Pale Waves	
24 June 2022	Green Day; Fall Out Boy; Weezer	Hella Mega Tour	Amyl and the Sniffers	
25 June 2022	Red Hot Chili Peppers	Global Stadium Tour	Anderson .Paak & Free Nationals; Thundercat	
26 June 2022	Red Hot Chili Peppers	Global Stadium Tour	A$AP Rocky; Thundercat	
3 June 2023	Burna Boy	Love, Damini Tour	—N/a	
7 July 2023	The Weeknd	After Hours til Dawn Tour	Kaytranada; Mike Dean	
8 July 2023	The Weeknd	After Hours til Dawn Tour	Kaytranada; Mike Dean	
20 June 2024	Foo Fighters	Everything or Nothing at All Tour	Wet Leg; Shame	
22 June 2024	Foo Fighters	Everything or Nothing at All Tour	Courtney Barnett; Hot Milk	
6 June 2025	Sam Fender	People Watching Tour	CMAT (musician) Olivia Dean	82,500/82,500
28 June 2025	Iron Maiden	Run for Your Lives World Tour	Halestorm; The Raven Age	
25 June 2026	Take That	The Circus Live – Summer 2026	The Script; Belinda Carlisle	
26 June 2026	Take That	The Circus Live – Summer 2026	The Script; Belinda Carlisle	
27 June 2026	Take That	The Circus Live – Summer 2026	The Script; Belinda Carlisle	
3 July 2026	Metallica	M72 World Tour	Gojira; Knocked Loose	
5 July 2026	Metallica	M72 World Tour	Pantera; Avatar	

== Transport ==
=== Rail ===
The stadium is located in the south of Queen Elizabeth Olympic Park. Stratford and Stratford International railway stations are the main stations nearest to the Olympic Park and are roughly a 20-minute walk to the stadium. Stratford International is served by Southeastern trains on High Speed 1 offering four trains per hour to St Pancras International, as well as other services to Kent, while Stratford station has London Overground services to North, West and South London, Elizabeth line services to Shenfield, Reading, Heathrow Terminals 2 & 3, Heathrow Terminal 5, and is on the Great Eastern Main Line to London Liverpool Street and East Anglia. Stratford is on London Underground's Jubilee and Central lines to Central London and the Docklands Light Railway (DLR). The DLR offers a direct service to London City Airport. In addition, Hackney Wick (London Overground) and Pudding Mill Lane (DLR) serve the stadium but may be closed during larger events due to capacity limitations.

Stations nearby:

Service	Station(s)	Lines
London Overground	Hackney Wick; Stratford	Mildmay line
Docklands Light Railway	Pudding Mill Lane; Stratford; Stratford International	Lewisham/Canary Wharf-Stratford; Stratford International–Beckton/Woolwich Arsenal
London Underground	Stratford	Central line
National Rail	Stratford	Great Eastern Main Line; West Anglia Main Line; Lea Valley Lines
National Rail	Stratford International	High Speed 1
Elizabeth line	Stratford	Elizabeth line

=== Road ===
The nearest public car parks for the stadium are at Westfield Stratford City, Stratford International station, and the Stratford Centre. The Queen Elizabeth Olympic Park also has several docking stations for the London Cycle Hire scheme.

=== Bus and coach ===
The following routes serve London Stadium directly:

Route	Start	End	Areas
108	Lewisham bus station	Stratford International station	East London, South-East London, South London
308	Wanstead	Clapton	East London
339	Shadwell station	Leytonstone station	East London, North-East London
388	Elephant & Castle	Stratford City bus station	Central London, East London, South London

A further 17 services use Stratford bus station and Stratford City bus station, which offer a network of services across East London. In addition, route 25 from City Thameslink serves Central London.

National Express coach services to Stratford bus station provide a direct connection to Stansted Airport and several other routes to Essex and East Anglia.

== See also ==
- Lists of stadiums

== Note ==
Events and tenants
Preceded by Beijing National Stadium; Beijing	Summer Olympics; Opening and closing ceremonies venue (Olympic Stadium); 2012	Succeeded by Maracanã; Rio de Janeiro
Preceded by Beijing National Stadium; Beijing	Summer Paralympics; Opening and closing ceremonies venue 2012	Succeeded by Maracanã; Rio de Janeiro
Preceded by Beijing National Stadium; Beijing	Summer Olympics; Athletics competitions Main venue 2012	Succeeded by Olympic Stadium; Rio de Janeiro
Preceded by Beijing National Stadium; Beijing	Summer Paralympics; Athletics competitions Main venue 2012	Succeeded by Olympic Stadium; Rio de Janeiro
Preceded by Beijing National Stadium; Beijing	World Championships in Athletics; Main venue 2017	Succeeded by Khalifa International Stadium; Doha
Preceded by None	Invictus Games; Opening ceremony venue 2014	Succeeded by Champion Stadium; Orlando
