= Shaleh Muhamad Aldjufri =

Indonesian politician

Doctor Habib Shaleh Muhamad Aldjufri Lc., M.A.
- صالح محمد الجفري
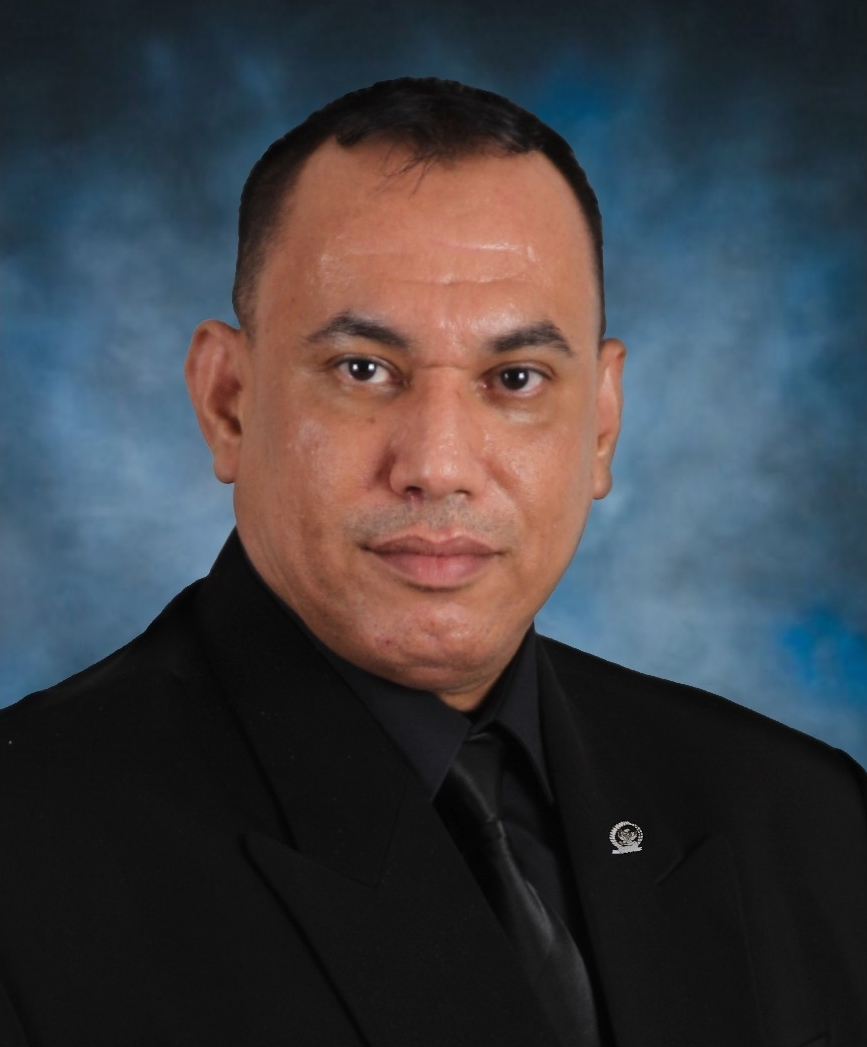
- Portrait of Shaleh in 2019 as Senator of the Republic of Indonesia from Central Sulawesi

Senator for Central Sulawesi
- Incumbent
- Assumed office September 29, 2015 Serving with List: Nurmawati Dewi Bantilan (2015–2019); Delis Jukarson Hehi (2015–2019); Ahmad Syaifullah Malonda (2015–2019); Abdul Rachman Thaha (2019–); Lukky Semen (2019–); Muhammad J. Wartabone (2019–)
- Preceded by: Ma'mun Amir
- Majority: 84,283 (2014); 160,196 (2019)
- In office Oktober 1, 2009 – Oktober 1, 2014 Serving with List: Nurmawati Dewi Bantilan (2009–2014); Ahmad Syaifullah Malonda (2009–2014); Silviana Hendriete Pandegirot (2011–2014); Sudarto (2009–2011)
- Preceded by: 2004–2009 period: Nurmawati Dewi Bantilan; Roger Tobigo; M. Ichsan Loulembah; Faisal Mahmud
- Succeeded by: 2014–2019 period: Ma'mun Amir; Nurmawati Dewi Bantilan; Delis Jukarson Hehi; Ahmad Syaifullah Malonda
- Majority: 78,303 (2009)

Personal details
- Born: Shaleh Muhamad Aldjufri; February 7, 1967 (age 59) Palu, Central Sulawesi, Indonesia
- Party: Independent
- Parent: Sayyid Muhammad bin Idrus al-Jufri (father)
- Relatives: Idrus bin Salim al-Jufri (grandfather); Saggaf bin Muhammad Aljufri (older brother); Salim Segaf Al-Jufri (cousin)
- Education: Al-Azhar University (1990–1995); Omdurman Islamic University (1995–1997); Alauddin Islamic State University (2008–2015)
- Occupation: Politician; ulama; senator; lecturer
- Known for: Chairman of the Alkhairaat Executive Board (1980–present)

Doctor Habib Shaleh Muhamad Aldjufri, Lc., M.A. (Arabic: صالح محمد الجفري, romanized: Ṣāliḥ Muḥammad al-Jufrī, Arabic pronunciation: [sˤɑːliħ muħɑmmɑd ɑl-dʒufriː]; February 7, 1967 – November 11, 2022) better known as Habib Shaleh was an Indonesian independent politician who is served as the Senator of the Republic of Indonesia (member of the Regional Representative Council of the Republic of Indonesia; DPD RI) from Central Sulawesi. Shaleh began serving as a member of the DPD RI after he ran for the 2009 Indonesian legislative election in the electoral district of Central Sulawesi. He got 78,303 votes and ranked fourth among the candidates who qualified as a Senator from Central Sulawesi.

Aside from being a Senator, Shaleh was Chairman of the Alkhairaat Executive Board since 1980. He was the younger brother of Habib Sayyid Saggaf bin Muhammad Aljufri, Supreme Head of Alkhairaat, and Habib Sayyid Ali bin Muhammad Aljufri, General Chairman of the Alkhairaat Executive Board. All three of them are the sons of Sayyid Muhammad bin Idrus al-Jufri and grandchildren of Habib Idrus bin Salim Al-Jufri, founder of Alkhairaat.

== Biography ==
=== Early life ===
Shaleh was born in Palu City on February 7, 1967. His father, Habib Sayyid Muhammad bin Idrus al-Jufri, was the Supreme Head of Alkhairaat in the period 1969–1974, succeeding his grandfather, Habib Sayyid Idrus bin Salim Al-Jufri, who died on December 22, 1969. After his father's died in 1974, the position of supreme head was later replaced by his eldest brother, Habib Sayyid Saggaf bin Muhammad Aljufri. In addition, his other brother, Habib Sayyid Ali bin Muhammad Aljufri, served as General Chairman of Alkhairaat. Habib Ali has also been the Chairman of the Indonesian Ulema Council of Central Sulawesi since 2014.

=== Education ===
Shaleh began his education from elementary to high school level in Alkhairaat, Palu. After graduating from high school, like his other family members, he was then sent to Al-Azhar University by his father, to study at the undergraduate level in 1990. After graduating in 1995, he continued his studies to the master's level at Omdurman Islamic University, Sudan, and graduated with a Master of Arts in 1997.

After a few years of not continuing his studies, in 2008, he took a doctoral level at Alauddin Islamic State University and graduated with a doctor in 2015.
