= Floating Mosque of Palu =

Former mosque in Palu, Central Sulawesi, Indonesia

- The mosque in 2018, captured 9 days before the tsunami

Religion
- Affiliation: Islam (former)
- Status: Inactive (ruins)

Location
- Location: Palu, Central Sulawesi, Indonesia
- Interactive map of Floating Mosque of Palu
- Coordinates: 0°53′03″S 119°51′14″E

Architecture
- Type: Mosque
- Completed: 2011
- Demolished: 28 September 2018
- Dome: 1

The Floating Mosque of Palu (Indonesian: Masjid Terapung Palu), also known as Arqam Babu Rahman Mosque was a mosque in the city of Palu, Central Sulawesi, Indonesia. The mosque is an icon of Palu, known for floating on Palu Bay.

It was hit by the 2018 Sulawesi earthquake and tsunami and partially submerged underwater, making it no longer in use.

== History ==
The Floating Mosque of Palu was inaugurated in 2011 in the area of 121 square meters, and known for directly facing Palu Bay on Talise beach. The mosque was a tourist destination and icon of the city of Palu. The mosque was dedicated to the 17th-century Muslim scholar from West Sumatra, Datuk Karama, who greatly contributed to the spread of Islam in the Palu region.

=== 2018 Sulawesi tsunami ===
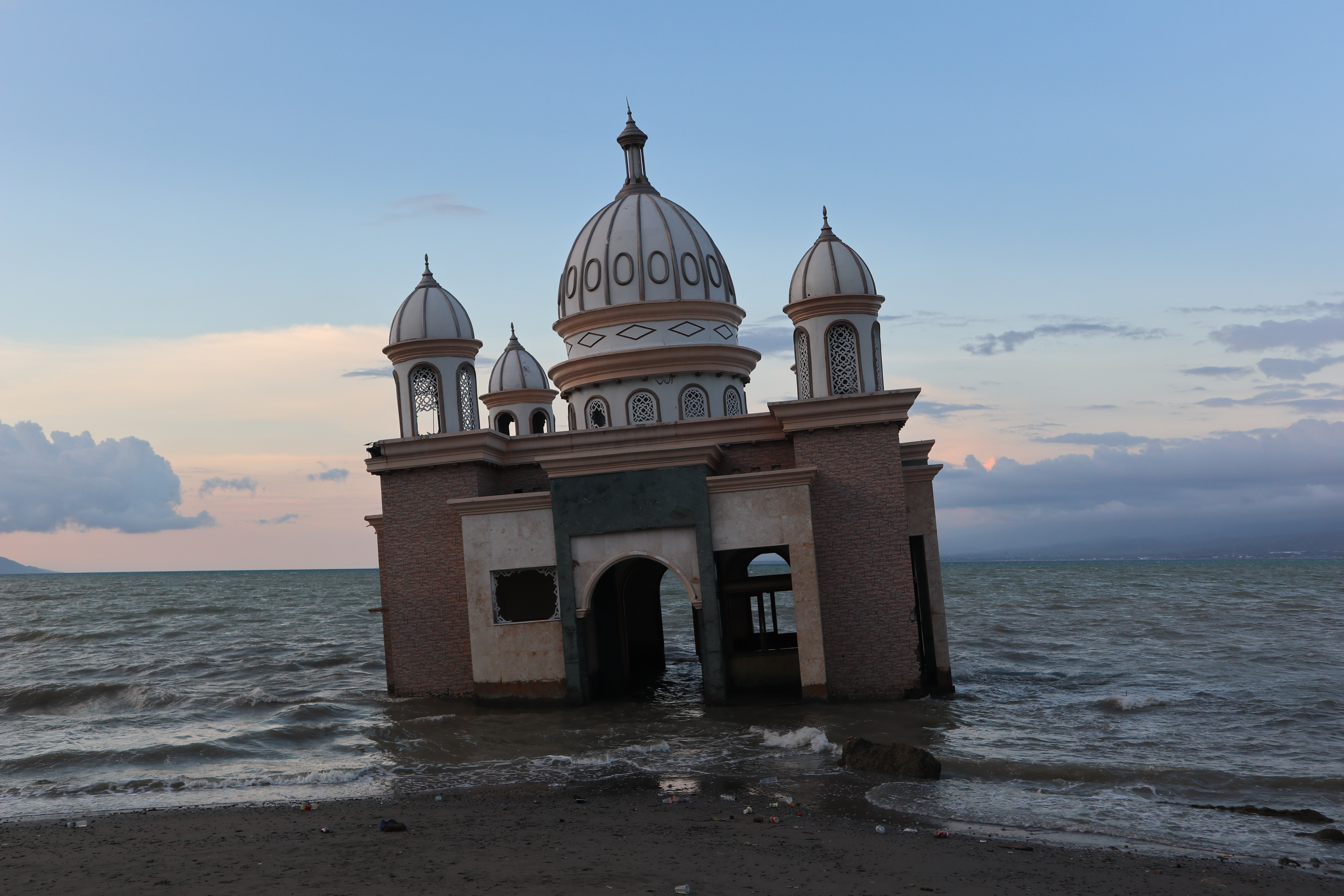
The submerged mosque as of 2020.

During the 2018 Sulawesi earthquake, the mosque was struck by multiple tsunamis which collapsed the pillars that supported the mosque floating on the bay. As such, the mosque has partially submerged in the ocean. However, the building remained intact. Reportedly, the wave entered through the back door and penetrated the front door, and the prayer space was inundated by the water. The windows also lost their glass. Adhan loudspeakers still functioned without any defects.

After the tsunami, the people of Palu, especially the traditionalist Muslims who believe in Islamic mysticism, asserted that the mosque survived because of the divine power of the saints who guarded the mosque. The floating mosque and the mosque of Alkhairaat traditionalist Islamic organization were few of the only surviving mosques after the tsunami.

As of April 2021, the mosque is still partially submerged underwater.

== See also ==
- Baiturrahim Mosque, another mosque that survived a tsunami
