= Kaili people =

Ethnic group in Indonesia

To Kaili
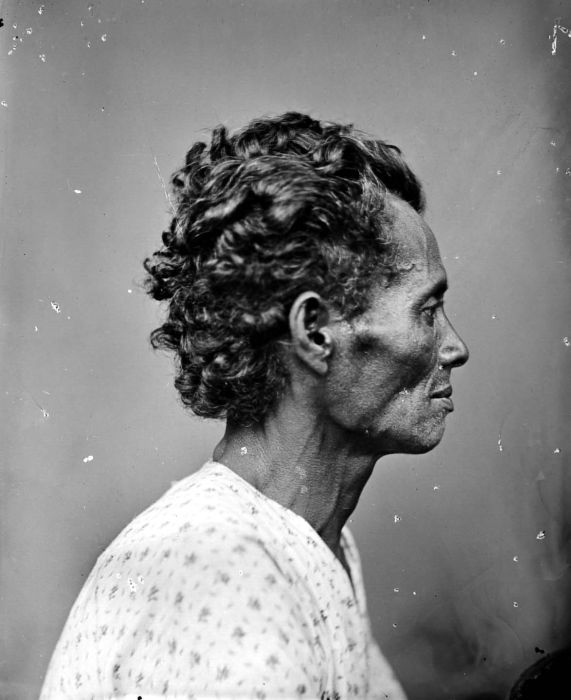
- Photo of a Kaili man (c. 1913), Wereldmuseum Amsterdam collection.

Total population
- 566,256 (2015)

Regions with significant populations
- Indonesia (Central Sulawesi)

Languages
- Kaili languages, Indonesian

Religion
- Islam; Christianity; Animism

Related ethnic groups
- Pamona, Kulawi, Mori

The Kaili people (Kaili: To Kaili) are an ethnic group primarily inhabiting Central Sulawesi, Indonesia, especially the regencies of Donggala, Sigi, and the city of Palu. They live in the valleys around Mount Gawalise, Mount Nokilalaki, Kulawi, and Mount Raranggonau, and also inhabit the eastern coastal regions of Central Sulawesi, including the regencies of Parigi-Moutong, Tojo Una-Una, and Poso. Kaili have settled in villages in Parigi, Sausu, Ampana, Tojo, and Una-Una; in Poso, they live in Mapane, Uekuli, and the Poso coastal areas.

Some sources suggest that the name "Kaili" comes from a tree called "kaili" and its fruit, commonly found in forests in this region, particularly along the Palu River and Palu Bay. Historically, the coastline of Palu Bay was about 34 kilometres (21 mi) further out than it is today, near Kampung Bangga. Evidence from Bobo to Bangga shows many coral and beach remnants, some of which are still affected by tidal changes.

The Kaili belongs to a larger Kaili ethnolinguistic group, which includes more than thirty subgroups, such as Kaili Rai, Kaili Ledo, Kaili Ija, Kaili Moma, Kaili Da'a, Kaili Unde, Kaili Inde, Kaili Tara, Kaili Bare'e, Kaili Doi, Kaili Torai, and others.

== Language ==
The Kaili people speak over twenty living languages in daily conversation. Remarkably, even villages only 2 kilometres (1.2 mi) apart may speak different languages.

The Kaili have a lingua franca called Ledo Kaili, which means "easy"; Ledo is used to communicate with speakers of other Kaili languages. The original form of Ledo (unaffected by incoming languages) is still spoken in Raranggonau and Tompu. In urban areas like Palu and Biromaru, Ledo has assimilated elements from other languages, particularly Mandar and Malay.

== Livelihood ==
The main occupations of the Kaili are farming rice and other crops, and growing vegetables. Highland communities also harvest forest products such as rattan, resin, and candlenuts. Coastal communities supplement farming with fishing and trade between islands, including Kalimantan.

The staple food of the Kaili is rice, since most lowlands from Palu and Parigi to Poso are rice-growing regions. During famines, corn is planted and eaten mixed with rice.

Farming tools include: pajeko (plow), salaga (hoe), pomanggi (mattock), pandoli (seat), taono (small spade). Fishing tools include: panambe, meka, rompo, jala (net), and tagau.

== Culture ==
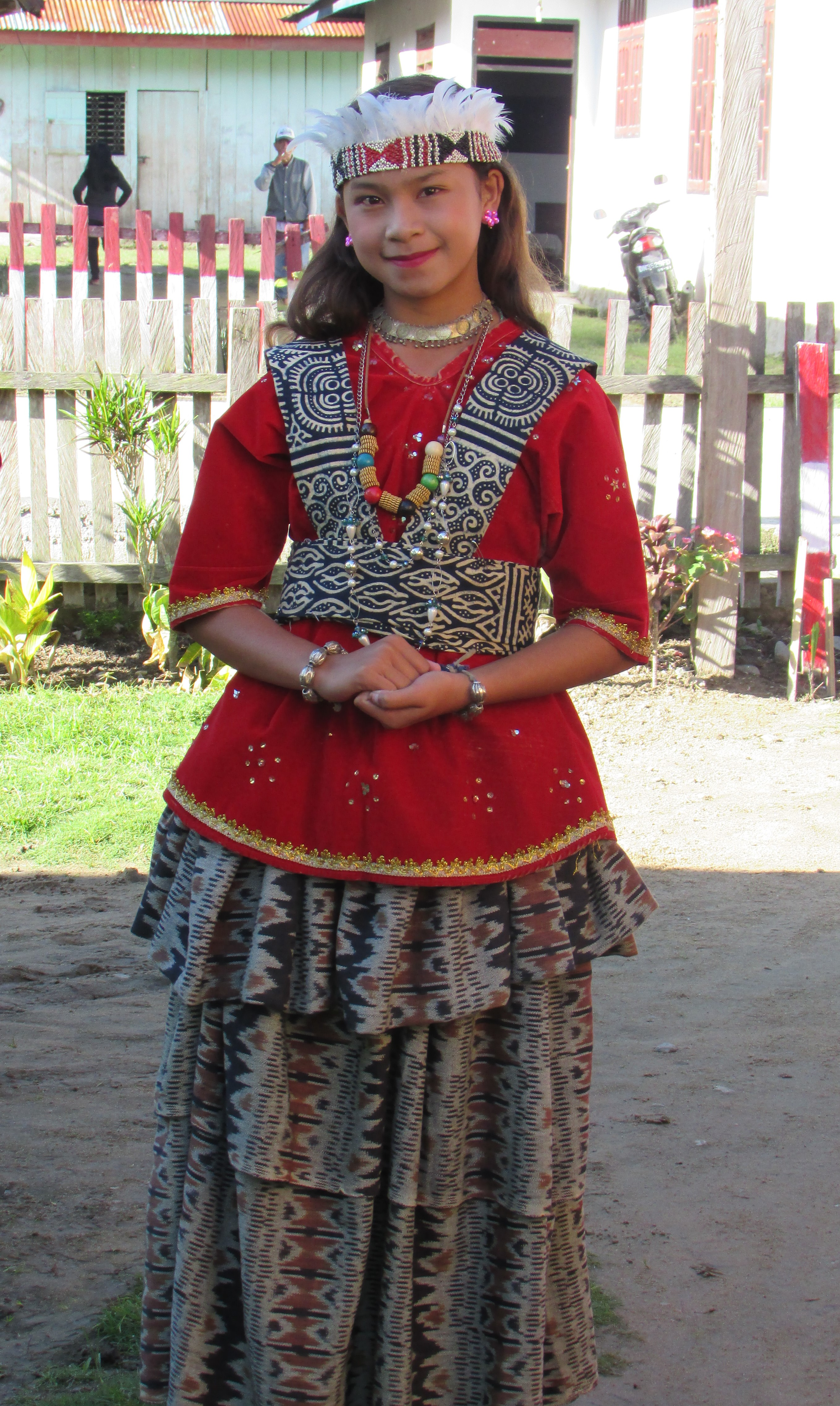
Traditional clothing of the Kaili from Tado

Like other Indonesian ethnic groups, the Kaili have traditional customs forming part of social life, including customary law (hukum adaik) and sanctions for violations.

Traditional ceremonies are held for life events such as coming-of-age, death, harvests, and healing rituals. Before Islam and Christianity, these ceremonies often involved animist rituals and chants.

After conversion to Islam and Christianity, ceremonies were adapted to religious teachings. Some Islamic practices include circumcision (posuna), Quran reading (popatama), and cutting the umbilical cord on the fortieth day after birth (niore ritoya).

Musical instruments in Kaili arts include: kakula (similar to gamelan), lalove (flute), ggeso-nggeso (double rebab), gimba (drum), gamba-gamba (small gamelan), golo (gong), and suli (suliang flute).

One notable craft is weaving sarongs, traditionally called buya sabe, now commonly known as Donggala sarongs. Common patterns are bomba, subi, kumbaja, and colors are named from natural sources, e.g., sesempalola (purple), lei-kangaro (orange), lei-pompanga (red).

In Kulawi culture, some traditional clothing is made from tree bark, called katevu, mostly used by women for skirts and traditional dresses.

Before Islam, Kaili communities practiced animism, worshiping ancestral spirits and gods of creation (tomanuru), fertility (buke or buriro), and healing (tampilangi). Islam arrived via the Minangkabau, such as Syekh Abdullah Raqie (known locally as Dato Karama), who settled in Kaili lands after studying in Mecca. His grave is now a cultural heritage site.

Social cohesion is visible in communal activities, weddings, funerals, and farming events, which are collectively known as intuvu ("mutual cooperation").
