= Souraja =

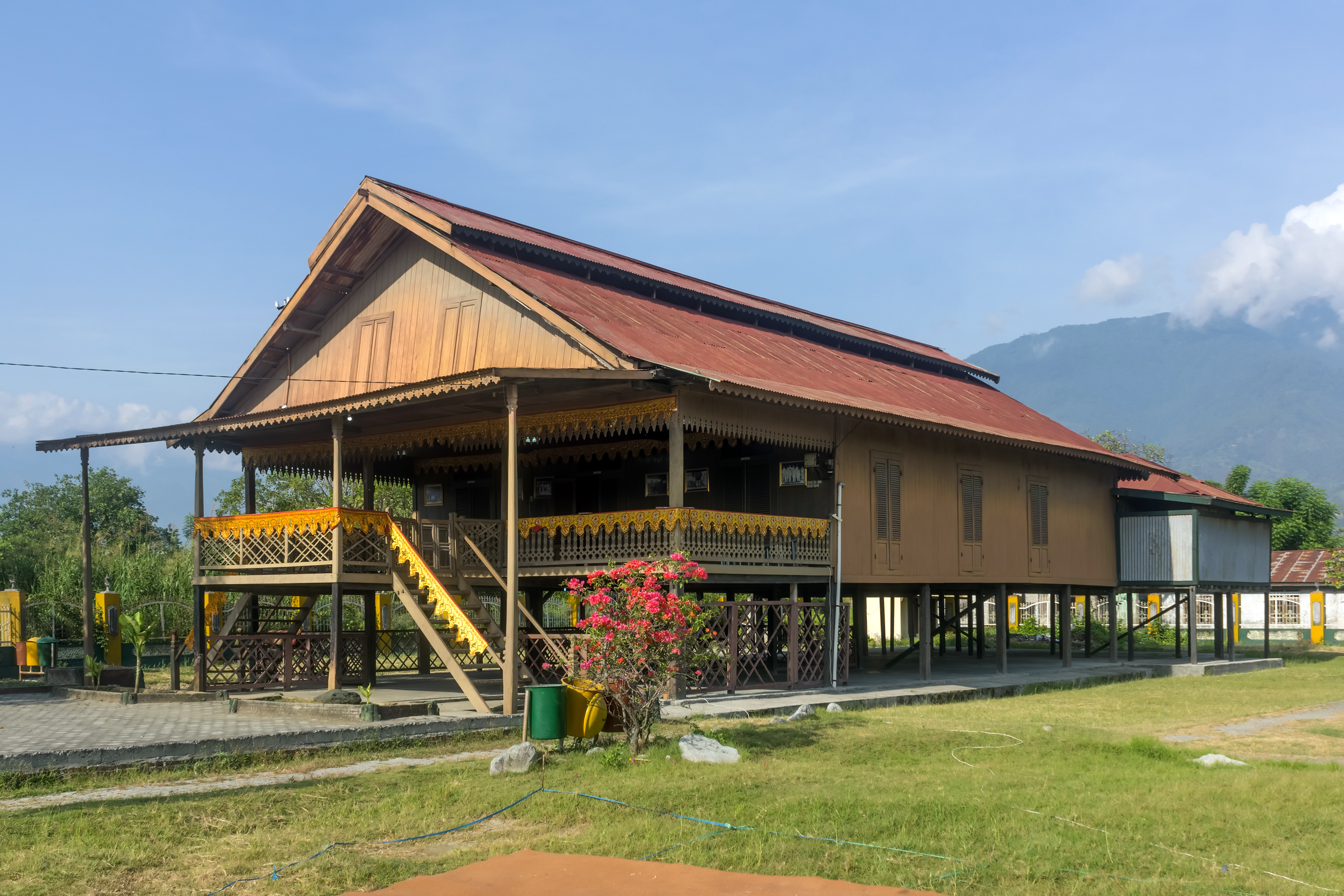
- Interactive map of the Souraja area

General information
- Architectural style: Vernacular
- Location: Jl. Pangeran Hidayat, Palu, Central Sulawesi, Indonesia
- Coordinates: 0°53′20″S 119°51′22″E
- Year built: 1892

Technical details
- Size: 32 m × 11.5 m (105 ft × 38 ft)
- Floor count: 1

Souraja is a rumah adat (traditional home) in Palu, Central Sulawesi, Indonesia, used by the magau (kings) of Palu. Built in 1892 using a combination of Bugis and Kaili vernacular architecture, Souraja is a wooden stilt house that measures 32 by 11.5 metres (105 ft × 38 ft).

== Description ==
Souraja is located in Lere Subdistrict of Palu, Central Sulawesi, Indonesia. It is located on Pangeran Hidayat Street, approximately 2.5 kilometres (1.6 mi) from the Palu city centre. Stilt houses have historically been common in the region, with those modelled after Souraja used by the nobility and plank-based models (kataba) used by the middle class.

Built of wood, Souraja fuses Bugis and Kaili vernacular architecture. The building measures 32 by 11.5 metres (105 ft × 38 ft), with the main body standing on 28 hardwood pillars. The separate kitchen stands atop 8 pillars. The front entrance of Souraja is flanked by staircases. The triangular gabled roof is ornamented by wooden engravings (panapiri) and carved moulding (bangko-bangko). Walls are made of wooden boards.

Inside, Souraja is divided into three main spaces: the Lonta Karavana (front space), Lonta Tatagana (central space), and Lonta Rarana (rear space). Such a spatial division is common in Kaili architecture. Traditionally, the front space is used to received guests, the central space is for the family, and the rear space is used for dining. The wooden floor is covered by mats.

Souraja is open to the public. Tourist groups are welcomed with the Mokambu dance and asked to wear a selendang (shawl). In accordance with local customs, visitors are expected to remove their shoes and wash their feet before entering. The building is known by various other names, including Banua Oge, Banua Mbaso and Banua Magau.

== History ==
Souraja was constructed in 1892 under the direction of Amir Pettalolo, the son-in-law of Yodjokodi, the magau (king) of the Kaili. No architect is recorded. It remained the primary domicile of the Kaili royal family, as well as a centre of governance.

From 1942 to 1945, during the Japanese occupation of the Dutch East Indies, Souraja was used as a barracks for Japanese soldiers. In the 1950s, after Indonesia's independence, the building was used as barracks for the Indonesian National Army. The building was identified as a cultural property of Indonesia in 1982.

Souraja was unaffected by the 2018 Sulawesi earthquake and tsunami, which caused widespread destruction in Palu and the surrounding areas. The building is commonly used for arts performances, including theatre and traditional music. A replica of the Souraja is located at the Central Sulawesi pavilion at Taman Mini Indonesia Indah in Jakarta.

== Works cited ==
- Amoreka, Jolinda (7 May 2022). "Sou Raja Rumah Pemimpin Lembah Palu di Masa Lalu, Wisata Sejarah yang Wajib Kamu Kunjungi" [Sou Raja, Home of the Palu Leaders in the Past, A Historical Tourism Site You Should Visit]. Tribun (in Indonesian). Archived from the original on 28 March 2026.
- Burhany, NR; Jiba RB, A.; Puteri, F.; Marwah, A. (2022). "Architectural Adaptation of Vernacular Stilt Houses in Palu City". IOP Conference Series: Earth and Environmental Science. 1075 012032. doi:10.1088/1755-1315/1075/1/012032.
- "Central Sulawesi Pavilion". Taman Mini Indonesia Indah. Archived from the original on 28 March 2026.
- Prabawanti, Margaretha Lina (7 August 2023). "Kokohnya Souraja, Istana Raja Palu yang Tahan Gempa" [The Strength of Souraja, the Earthquake-Resistant Palace of the Kings of Palu]. Detik.com (in Indonesian). Archived from the original on 28 March 2026.
- Sabandar, Switzy (7 August 2023). "Souraja, Istana Raja yang Jadi Bangunan Cagar Budaya di Palu" [Souraja, the King's Palace and Cultural Heritage Site in Palu]. Liputan6 (in Indonesian). Archived from the original on 28 March 2026.
- Thahir, Harifuddin; Arief, Irdinal; Hidayah, Noor Riefma; Namira, Suci Amalia (2023). "The Prospects for the Development of Souraja Cultural Heritage Area for Community-Based Tourism Development, Palu City". Journal of Community Empowerment. 4 (1): 22–35.
- Utami, Silmi Nurul; Gischa, Serafica (5 May 2021). "Souraja, Rumah Adat Sulawesi Tengah" [Souraja, a Traditional House in Central Sulawesi]. Kompas (in Indonesian). Archived from the original on 28 March 2026.
- Zubaidi, Fuad (September 2009). "Arsitektur Kaili sebagai Proses dan Produk Vernakular" [Kaili Architecture as a Vernacular Process and Product] (PDF). Ruang (in Indonesian). 1 (1): 27–37.
