= Abdul Somad =

Indonesian Islamic preacher

Ustaz Abdul Somad
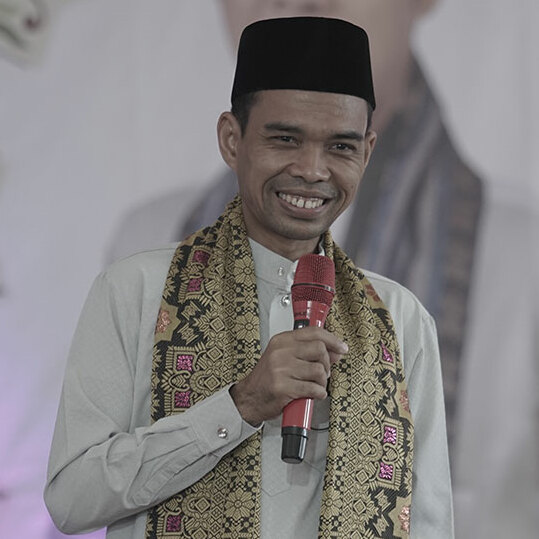
- Somad in 2022

Personal life
- Born: Abdul Somad Batubara 18 May 1977 (age 49) Asahan, North Sumatra, Indonesia
- Home town: Pekanbaru, Riau, Indonesia
- Era: Contemporary
- Education: Al-Azhar University, Egypt Dar al-Hadith al-Hasaniyyah, Morocco Omdurman Islamic University, Sudan
- Known for: Dawah
- Occupation: Da'i, hadith scholar, lecturer
- Website: somadmorocco.blogspot.co.id

Religious life
- Religion: Islam
- Denomination: Sunni
- Jurisprudence: Shafi'i
- Tariqa: Naqshbandi
- Creed: Ash'ari
- Movement: PERTI

Instagram information
- Page: UAS عبد الصمد
- Followers: 9.5 Million (28 October 2024)

Abdul Somad Batubara (born 18 May 1977) is an Indonesian Islamic preacher, scholar and motivator from Asahan, North Sumatra. He served as a lecturer at the Sultan Syarif Kasim II State Islamic University (UIN Suska) in Riau.

In addition to his lectures, he has authored books, including translations of Arabic publications, and religious guides on subjects such as Qurbani and Salah. Somad's often controversial views has resulted in him being considered persona non grata in various countries, and he along with his supporters has been accused of being engaged with Islamic extremism.

== Background ==
Abdul Somad was born on 18 May 1977 in Silo Lama, a village in Asahan Regency, North Sumatra, as the son of Bakhtiar and Rohana. From the mother's side, he is descended from Sheikh Abdurrahman, nicknamed Tuan Syekh Silau Laut I, a Sufi scholar of the Shattari Order who was born in Rao. He is descended from Minangkabau immigrants whose ancestors came from Mudik Tampang, Rao, Pasaman.

Abdul Somad rose to prominence primarily due to YouTube and social media in a time of rapid growing internet users in Indonesia. He is well known for his humorous rhetoric in delivering dawah. His views of Islam is considered to be fundamentalist and objective with his lectures encompassing literal topics on Quran and Sunnah.

== Controversies ==
=== Islamic views ===
In an October 2017 video posted on the Islamic-oriented YouTube channel Fodamara TV, Abdul Somad attracted controversy for stating that Muslims who shop or buy at coffee shops owned by Starbucks would go to hell due to the company's pro-LGBT policies. The video went viral in March 2018 with many online mocking the preacher for being hypocritical, noting that many of the platforms that Somad uses to spread his message such as YouTube, Facebook, and Twitter have similar pro-LGBT policies like Starbucks. Note that LGBT is probihibited in Islamic view.

In 2019, Somad was reported to police for delivering a speech in which he denounced the crucifix, and stated that any Muslim dying in a hospital with crucifixes would be sent to Hell because the crucifix contained a jinn, a supernatural creature believed to exist by pre-Islamic Arabian tribes and Muslims. However, that speech is intended for internal program at a mosque, for general audience. In Islamic view, the crucifix itself generally contained a jinn, along with other sculptures.

Somad was also affiliated with the Islamic Defenders Front (FPI). The latter organization was eventually banned by the Indonesian government due to radicalism as well. He was also a secretary of Batsul Masail forum at Nahdhatul Ulama Riau, a prominent Islamic organization in Indonesia.

=== COVID-19 pandemic ===
During the COVID-19 pandemic, in one of his sermons, Somad claimed that the virus causing it is the "soldier of Allah" that was sent to protect the Uyghur Muslims from Chinese repression. He stated that Uyghur Muslims are not infected by the virus because they perform wudu regularly. After the pandemic entered Indonesia, and some of the Muslims living there caught the disease and died because of it, including Tengku Zulkarnain, an Indonesian Islamic scholar who Somad considered as his teacher, Somad changed his stance, claiming that every Muslim who dies due to the pandemic are considered Shahid, and asserted that his previous claim that said the virus is the "soldier of Allah" is just of one of the many interpretations, and it would be wrong if people think that it is just the only interpretation.

=== Banned from various countries ===
Somad had been refused entry to several countries such as East Timor, Switzerland, Hong Kong, the Netherlands, the United Kingdom and Germany.

On 16 May 2022, Somad, accompanied with six individuals came to Singapore, claiming to be on holiday purpose, but his entry was denied and he was deported to Batam on the same day. Singapore's Ministry of Home Affairs (MHA) cited his past "extremist and segregationist" preachings as the reason for the government's refusal to let him enter the country. The MHA added that Somad, in the past, had preached that suicide bombings are legitimate in the context of the Israeli-Palestinian conflict, and are considered "martyrdom" operations; and he has also made comments denigrating members of other faiths, such as Christians, by describing the Christian crucifix as the dwelling place of an "infidel jinn (spirit/demon)".

Somad then reacted in a video, claiming that "Singapore actually belongs to the Malays", and that Singaporeans of other races are just immigrants there. He added, "In the future, God willing, the time will come, perhaps in the era of our grandchildren, the ones who will be in power are the Malays and that country shall be conquered back, so they will feel the pain, impudent!" He also remarked that if "all Indonesians take a piss together and channel it towards Singapore, the island will sink". His supporters spammed the social media accounts of various Singapore's political leaders and governmental organizations, with several threatening to wage a repetition of the September 11 attacks on Singapore. Somad also added that he would not "give up" in trying to visit Singapore.

=== Claiming music as a medium for Satan's entry ===
In a video recording of one of his sermons, Somad said: "Satan enters through the ear into the heart via music; the songs that we often hear will be stuck in our ears, and when we go to sleep [the devil] comes, so don't listen to music." However, another video emerged in which Somad, accompanied by a piano, sang Bila Tiba by Pasha Ungu.

=== Wikipedia edits ===
On 16 June 2022, Somad stated that Wikipedia published defamatory information that are harmful to him. Somad claimed that his Wikipedia article called him an extremist and he had allowed suicide bombing. Somad claimed that his cyber team had attempted to change the article, but the changes are rejected by Wikipedia and his changes are undone.

== Personal life ==
Somad married Mellya Juniarti in 2012. The couple divorced in 2019. In 2021, he married Fatimah Az Zahra Salim Barabud. He has two children, one from his earlier marriage, and the second from his present one.
