= Baiturrahim Mosque =

Mosque in Banda Aceh, Aceh, Indonesia

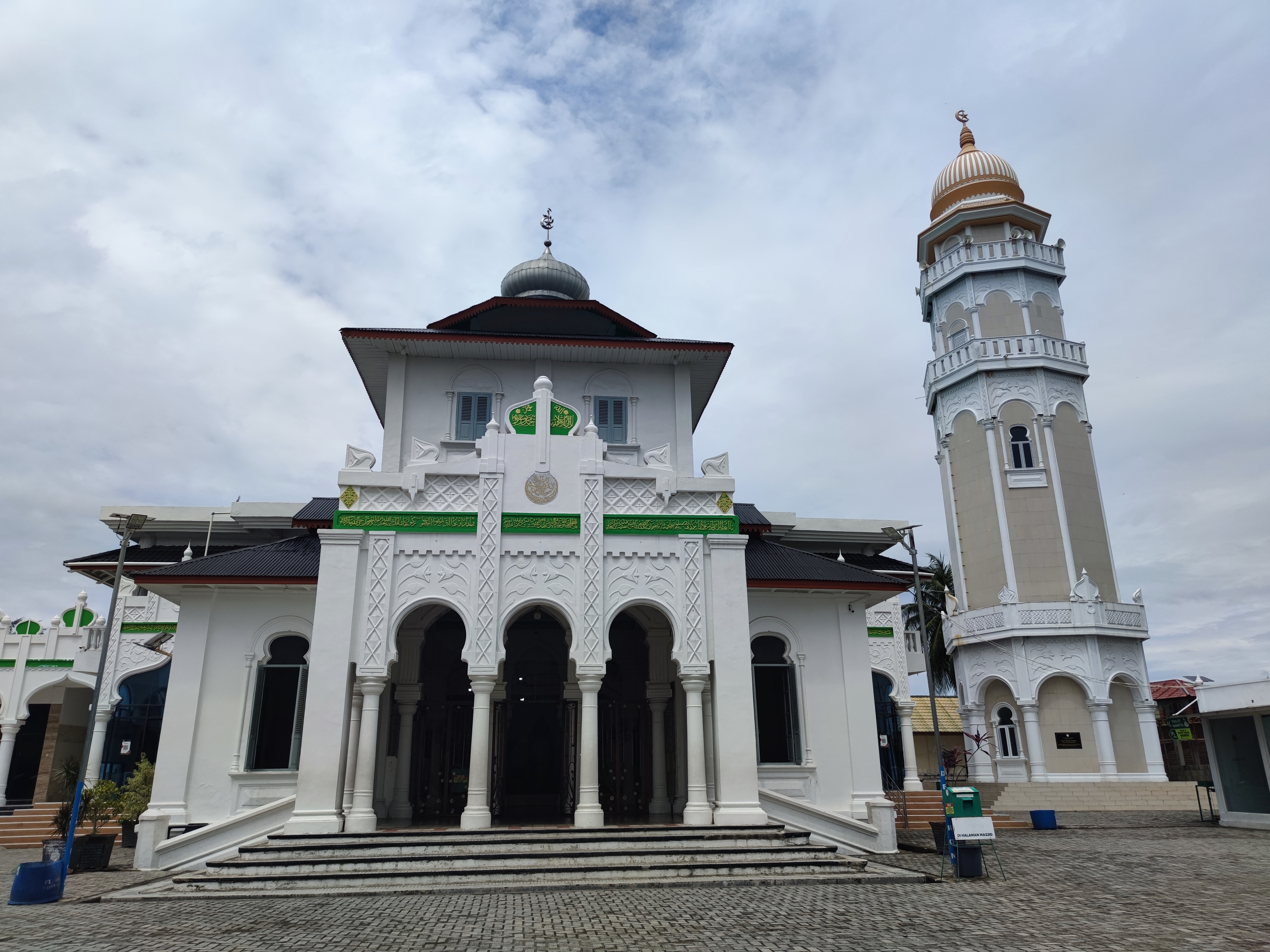

- Location in Aceh, Northern Sumatra, Sumatra and Indonesia Baiturrahim Mosque (Northern Sumatra) Baiturrahim Mosque (Sumatra) Baiturrahim Mosque (Indonesia)

Religion
- Affiliation: Islam
- Branch/tradition: Sunni

Location
- Location: Ulèë Lheuë, Banda Aceh, Indonesia
- Interactive map of Baiturrahim Mosque
- Coordinates: 5.555789°N 95.284188°E

Architecture
- Type: Mosque
- Style: Moorish
- Completed: 1922

Baiturrahim Mosque (Indonesian: Masjid Baiturrahim) is a mosque located in the Meuraksa sub-district of Ulèë Lheuë, Banda Aceh, Aceh, Indonesia. As a legacy of the sultan of Aceh in the 17th century, it is one of the historical mosques in Indonesia. Previously, the mosque was named Jami Ulee Lheu Mosque. In 1873, when the Baiturrahman Grand Mosque was burned by the Dutch, all the worshipers held a Friday prayer at Ulee Lheue. Since then, the name of the mosque has been Baiturrahim Mosque.

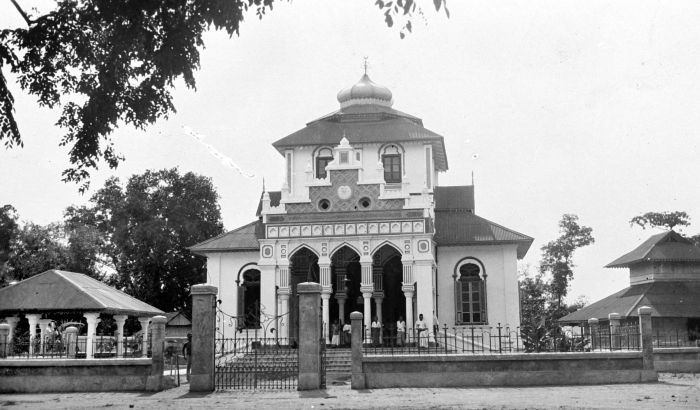
Baiturrahim Mosque in 1929

Since its establishment, the mosque has been restored several times. Initially the building was completely made out of wood, with a simple shape and was located next to the location of the present mosque. Because it was made out of wood, the building did not last long as weathering had torn the building down. In 1922 the mosque was re-built with long-lasting material by the government of the Dutch East Indies with European architectural style. However, this construction did not use iron or bone braces, and the building was built with bricks and cement only.

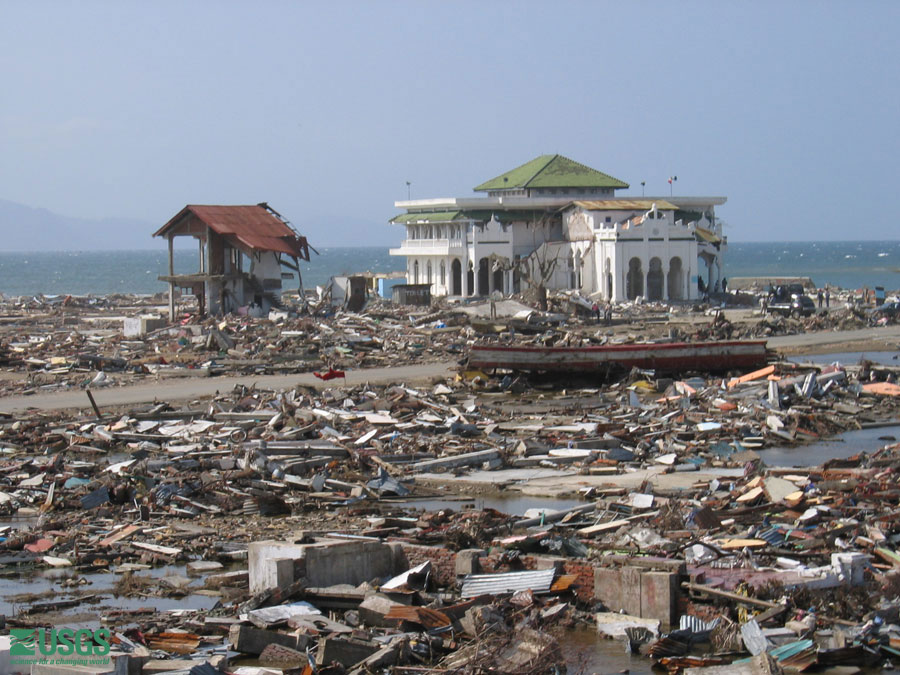
Baiturrahim Mosque after tsunami in December 2004

In 1983, Banda Aceh was rocked by a devastating earthquake, and it undermined the dome of the mosque. Afterward, the mosque was rebuilt, but the dome was not reinstalled; it was instead replaced by a normal roof. Ten years later, a massive renovation of the mosque was commenced, leaving the front part the only original part of the building. Sixty percent of the remaining parts were renovated. Until today, the original part of the mosque still looks solid on the front.

On 26 December 2004, an earthquake and subsequent tsunami leveled the entire buildings around the mosque, making Baiturrahim Mosque the only surviving structure in the area. The condition of the part of the mosque made of bricks was only damaged about twenty percent, and the people of Aceh highly honored this mosque as a symbol of God's greatness.

== See also ==
- Islam in Indonesia
- List of mosques in Indonesia
- Floating Mosque of Palu, another mosque that partially survived a tsunami
