= Ulèë Lheuë =

Area in Meuraxa sub-district, Banda Aceh, Indonesia

Coordinates: 5°33′N 95°17′E

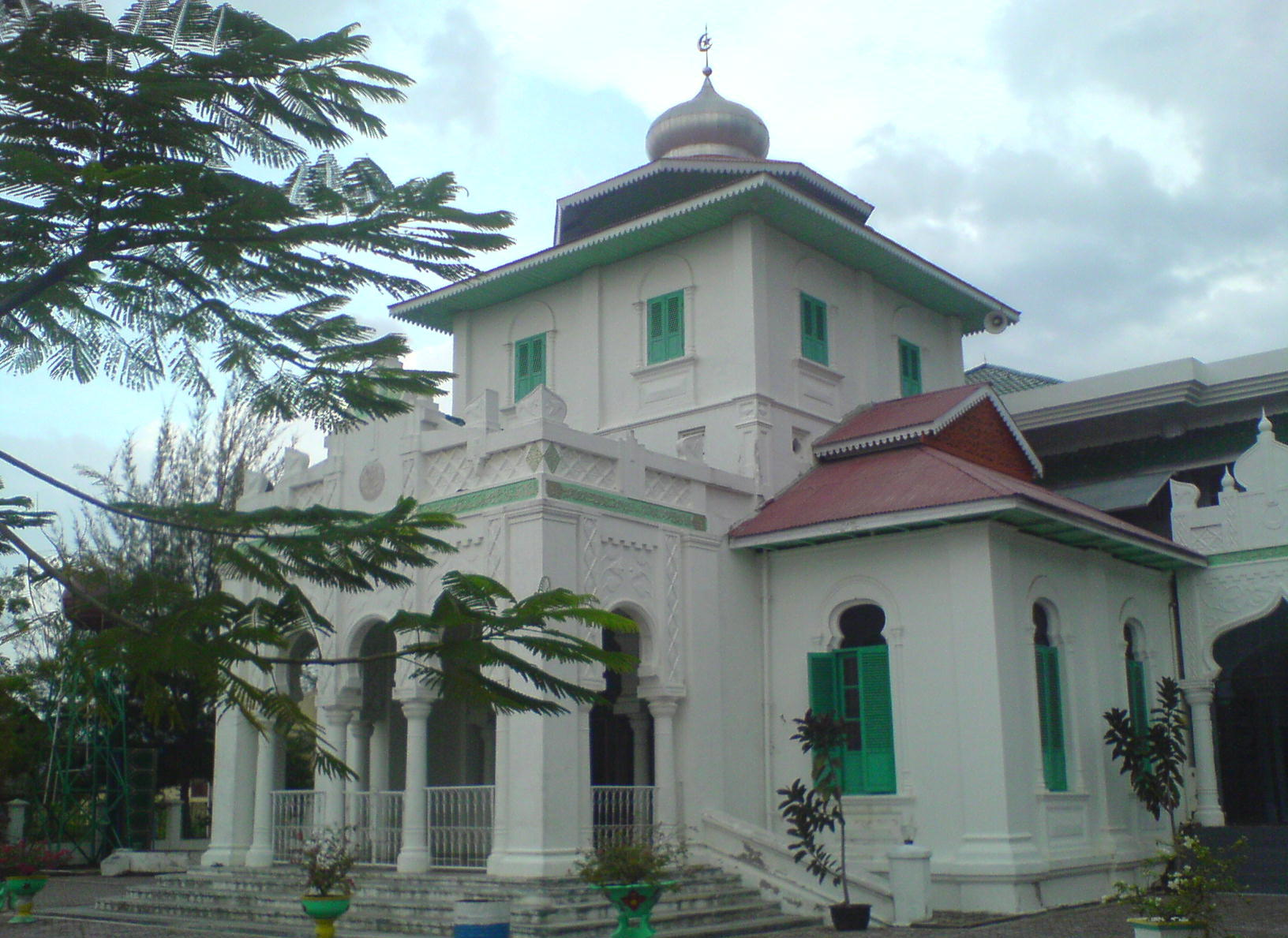
Baiturrahim Mosque, Ulèë Lheuë

Ulèë Lheuë ([u.lɛ.ə lʰɯ.ə]) is an area in Meuraxa sub-district, Banda Aceh, Indonesia. It was the former main seaport of Aceh. The town and seaport was heavily damaged and depopulated during the 2004 Indian Ocean earthquake and tsunami.

== Description ==
Ulèë Lheuë is made of two words - Ulèë means "head" and "lheuë" means little peninsula.

The town was most popular during the reign of Aceh Sultanate as a busy international seaport for spice trading.

Ulèë Lheuë was devastated by the 2004 Indian Ocean earthquake and tsunami—the majority of the town's buildings were destroyed, and less than 10% of the pre-tsunami population of 6000 survived. The area was reconstructed in 2005. A new ferry terminal has been built, funded by the Australian Government (implemented by UNDP).

One notable building to survive the tsunami is the 17th-century Baiturrahim Mosque.

== See also ==
- 2004 Indian Ocean earthquake and tsunami
