= Saggaf bin Muhammad Aljufri =

Indonesian Islamic scholar (1937–2021)

Habib Sayyid Saggaf bin Muhammad Aljufri, M.A.
- سيد سقاف بن محمد الجفري
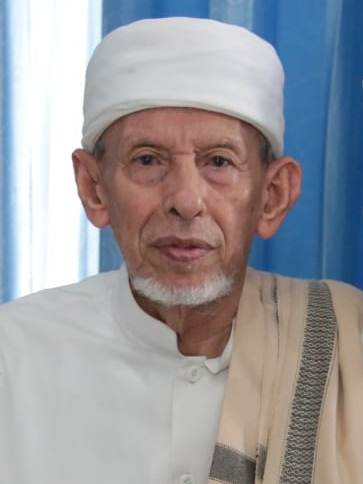
- Habib Sayyid Saggaf Aljufri in 2018

Supreme Head of Alkhairaat
- In office 1974 – 3 August 2021
- Preceded by: Sayyid Muhammad bin Idrus al-Jufri

Rector of Alkhairaat University
- In office 1967–1989
- Preceded by: Sayyid Idrus bin Salim al-Jufri
- Succeeded by: Ir. Faisal Shahab

Personal details
- Born: Sayyid Saggaf; 17 August 1937 Pekalongan, Central Java, Indonesia
- Died: 3 August 2021 (aged 83) Indonesia
- Resting place: Pekalongan (1937–1951); Palu (1951–2021)
- Spouses: Syarifah Ruqayah Al-Jufri (m. 1967) Syarifah Zahrah bin Yahya (m. 1971): Syarifah Umnah Ar-Rumi
- Children: 7
- Parents: Sayyid Muhammad bin Idrus al-Jufri (father); Syarifah Raquan binti Thalib al-Jufri (mother)
- Relatives: Idrus bin Salim al-Jufri (grandfather)
- Education: Al-Azhar University (Bachelor's degree, 1959–1963); Al-Azhar University (Master of Arts, 1963–1967)
- Occupation: Ulama; preacher; merchant
- Known for: Supreme Head of Alkhairaat

Personal life
- Era: Modern era
- Region: Sulawesi
- Education: Al-Azhar University
- Other name: Sayyid Saggaf Aljufri

Religious life
- Denomination: Sunni
- Jurisprudence: Shafi‘i
- Tariqa: Ba 'Alawiyya
- Creed: Ashʿari

Habib Sayyid Saggaf bin Muhammad Aljufri, M.A. (Arabic: سقاف بن محمد الجفري, romanized: Saqqāf bin Muḥammad al-Jufrī, Arabic pronunciation: [saqqaːf bin muħammad al-dʒufriː]; 17 August 1937 – 3 August 2021) was an Indonesian Islamic scholar from Palu who was born in Pekalongan. He was one of the respected people among the society and was often visited by state officials to discuss religious and national issues. Public figures visited him especially when Alkhairaat held a ceremonial to remember the death (haul) of Habib Sayyid Idrus bin Salim al-Jufri or commonly known among the public as "Guru Tua". Like on 1 September 2012, when on 44th ceremonial to remember the death of Guru Tua, Minister of Religion Affairs of the Republic of Indonesia Suryadharma Ali visited Aljufri at his residence in Palu and discussing the matter of the Islamic flow of Sunni and Shia, Aljufri welcomed him kindly. The discussion occurred after problems arose regarding the conflict between Sunni and Shiite Islam after the clash which killed a resident in Sampang Regency, Madura Island. In addition to frequent dialogue with Sunni figures, Aljufri also often discussed with several Shia figures, even he received several visits of Shiite figures at his residence.

Aljufri graduated from Al-Azhar University in 1967. After graduating from Al-Azhar, moments later he was appointed dean of the Ushuluddin Faculty, the State Islamic Institute of Palu from 1967 to 1977. In 1977, he was elected Chairman of the Indonesian Ulema Council of Central Sulawesi. In addition, he also became the General Chairman of the Gerakan Usaha Pembaharuan Pendidikan Islam (GUPPI) in Central Sulawesi. Since the death of his father, Sayyid Muhammad bin Idrus al-Jufri (Supreme Head of Alkhairaat since 1969 after the death of Guru Tua) in 1974, Aljufri was appointed supreme head in 1974 replacing his father.

== Biography ==
=== Early life ===
Sayyid Saggaf bin Muhammad Aljufri was born in Pekalongan as the eldest son in 1937 with the same date as the Independence Day of the Republic of Indonesia, 17 August. He came from the Ba 'Alawi sada clan of the Hadhrami Arab family with surnamed al-Jufri (Arabic: الجفري, romanized: al-Jufrī, Arabic pronunciation: [al-dʒufriː]), his father was a cleric named Sayyid Muhammad bin Idrus al-Jufri, the son of a great cleric from Palu who was the founder of Alkhairaat, Habib Sayyid Idrus bin Salim al-Jufri. While his mother was an Indonesian female Islamic scholar named Hababah Syarifah Raquan binti Thalib Al-Jufri.
