= Nizar Rayan =

Palestinian political and religious leader (1959–2009)

Leader in Hamas
- In office 2004 – 1 January 2009
- Preceded by: Sheikh Ahmed Yassin

Personal details
- Born: 6 March 1959 Jabalia, Gaza Strip
- Died: 1 January 2009 (aged 49) Jabalia, Gaza Strip
- Cause of death: Airstrike
- Party: Hamas
- Spouse: 4 wives (all deceased)
- Children: 13 (12 deceased, 1 children survived)
- Education: Imam Muhammad ibn Saud Islamic University, Omdurman Islamic University, University of Jordan
- Occupation: Professor of Islamic law
- Known for: Hamas leadership

Nizar Rayan (Arabic: نزار ريان, Nɩzár Rɑȋán, also transliterated Rayyan; 6 March 1959 – 1 January 2009) was a high-ranking Hamas leader who served as a liaison between the Palestinian organization's political leadership and its military wing. Also a professor of Islamic law, he became a top Islamic cleric within Hamas after the death of Sheikh Ahmed Yassin in 2004. Rayan was a strong promoter between 1994 and 2004 of suicide bombings on Israel, and his son killed himself on one such mission. Rayan and most of his family were killed in an Israeli airstrike during the Gaza War (2008–09).

== Personal life ==
Rayan was born in Jabalia, Gaza Strip on 6 March 1959. In 1982, he received a BSc degree in Theology and Religious studies from Imam Muhammad ibn Saud Islamic University in Riyadh, Saudi Arabia. While there he was influenced by Wahhabism and Salafism. He then attended the University of Jordan in Amman and in 1990 received a masters MSc degree with honors. In 1994, Rayan completed his PhD in Islamic studies at the Omdurman Islamic University in Omdurman, Sudan. His dissertation has the title of Future of Islam: Objective Analysis.

After his studies, Rayan returned to Gaza and was employed as an imam at several mosques, Jabalia's Imad Aqil Mosque (also known as the "Mosque of martyrs") among them. He later became a professor of Islamic law at the Islamic University of Gaza. Rayan was a leading authority on Hadith (sayings of the Islamic prophet Muhammad), and he amassed a 5,000-book library in his home. An Israeli intelligence source described Rayan as a strong opponent of Shia Islam, who opposed allowing any form of Shia Islam to establish a foothold in Gaza and the West Bank.

Eventually, according to The Jerusalem Post, Rayan became an important leader in Hamas, in particular an Islamic leader of Hamas's military wing, and he regularly went on patrol with Hamas militia after delivering lectures at the Islamic University. He arguably became Hamas's leading clerical authority after an Israeli airstrike killed Sheikh Ahmed Yassin in 2004.

Rayan along with Hamas and Palestinian Islamic Jihad began to strongly advocate for suicide bombings to be carried out against Israel in 1994. According to Chris Hedges who interviewed him, Rayan constantly said that Hamas, "began to target Israeli civilians in 1994 only after Palestinian worshipers were gunned down in a Hebron mosque by a Jewish settler, Baruch Goldstein."

In 2001, Rayan sent his 22-year-old son on a suicide bombing mission, in which he died and killed two Israelis at the former Israeli settlement Elei Sinai in the Gaza Strip. Rayan is alleged to have directed the 2004 Ashdod Port attack which killed ten people. Hamas ceased its suicide attacks against Israel in 2005, but Rayan advocated for their renewal after the 2008-2009 Gaza conflict began.

Rayan was one of the main commanders who oversaw the 2007 Battle of Gaza, in which Hamas expelled Fatah from Gaza. Fatah security forces were militarily defeated, the battle resulting in the death of 115 fighters and 400 civilians. Both Hamas and Fatah were accused of atrocities, including torture, during the conflict. According to The Jerusalem Post, Rayan, "boasted that the Gaza Strip had been 'cleansed' of 'traitors' 'secularists' and 'CIA agents' - a reference to Abbas and his former security and intelligence chiefs." According to a Hamas spokesperson, it is possible the Fatah-dominated Palestinian National Authority asked Israel to kill Rayan due to his role in the Hamas-Fatah clashes. He added that Rayan was one of the main reasons why many of Mahmoud Abbas's men "did not sleep well at all at night."

Rayan was strongly opposed to the state of Israel. According to Israeli-American writer Jeffrey Goldberg, he at one time stated, "True Islam would never allow a Jewish state to survive in the Arab and Muslim Middle East. Israel is an impossibility. It is an offense against God." Goldberg also reported that Rayan said he believed Jews are a "cursed people" some of whom were transformed into pigs and apes by Allah, and that Jews must pay for murdering the prophets of Islam and "closing [their] ears to the Messenger of Allah."

Rayan married four women with whom he had 12 children.

== Hamas takeover of Gaza ==
Following the 2007 Hamas takeover of Gaza, Rayan said that "In a few hours, the secular era in Gaza will end without leaving a trace... Today heresy and apostasy ends. Today the struggle is between Islam and the non-muslim infidels, and it will end with the victory of the faith." He added that he would transform the PA security forces headquarters in Gaza to a mosque. Following the speech, Fatah members expressed great fear that Hamas would transform Gaza into a Taliban-style Islamist emirate with Iranian and Syrian military support.

== Gaza War (2008–2009) ==
During the Gaza War (2008–2009), most of the Hamas political leadership went underground, however despite not being part of the Qassam Brigades wing Nizar involved himself militarily in the conflict. He justified his position in an interview by saying that “By God, if they raid my home do I just tell them I am a member of the political organ? They are invading my country so it is my duty to fight them. To serve in politics does not mean I cannot fight those who force themselves on my country.”

== Family annihilation ==
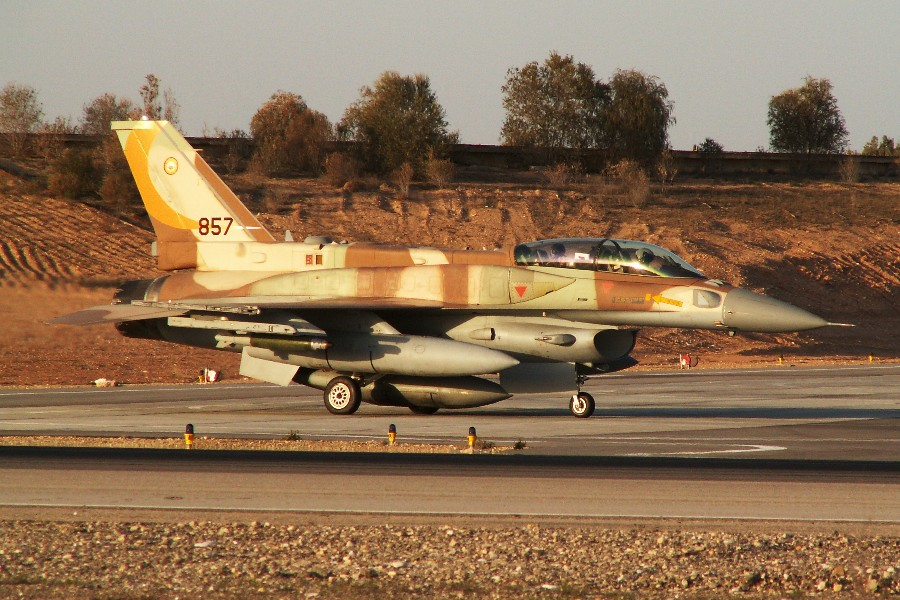
Israeli F-16i of the 107th Squadron preparing for take-off during Gaza War (2008–2009)

Rayan and his entire family, including his spouses and all of his surviving children were killed in an Israeli Air Force strike on 1 January 2009 during the Gaza War (2008–09). The day before the attack, Rayan had advocated renewal of suicide bombings on Israel, declaring, "Our only language with the Jews is through armed resistance and Jihad". A 2,000-pound bomb was dropped on his house by an Israeli F-16 fighter jet, also killing his 4 wives (Hiam 'Abdul Rahman Rayan, 46; Iman Khalil Rayan, 46; Nawal Isma'il Rayan, 40; and Sherine Sa'id Rayan, 25) and 11 of their children (As'ad, 2; Usama Ibn Zaid, 3; 'Aisha, 3; Reem, 4; Miriam, 5; Halima, 5; 'Abdul Rahman, 6; Abdul Qader, 12; Aaya, 12; Zainab, 15; and Ghassan, 16).

Unlike other Hamas leaders at risk of being targeted by Israel, Rayan did not go underground after the first Gaza war with Israel began in late December 2008. According to a Hamas spokesperson, the IDF and Shin Bet warned Rayan by contacting his telephone that an attack on his house was imminent. An Israeli military spokesperson interviewed by The International Herald Tribune "could not give details or specify whether Rayan's family had been warned."

Israeli security sources stated that Rayan's house, at the time of the attack, was a munitions warehouse and communications center, and contained a tunnel opening. The sources also stated that a weapons cache in the house triggered many secondary explosions immediately after the air strike. The New York Daily News commented that Rayan had "sacrificed his children - in a vain attempt to protect a weapons base beneath his home." Israeli security forces legal officials regard striking homes used for weapons storage, when sufficient warning is given to the residents, as falling within the boundaries of international law and a legitimate act of war. However, in the opinion of B'Tselem (The Israeli Center for Human Rights Information in the Occupied Territories), even if the Israeli charge that Rayan's house was an arms warehouse was true, the large number of civilian lives taken rendered the attack "a grave breach of international humanitarian law." The Israeli NGO added that, given the Israeli military "knew or should have known" that civilians had not left Rayan's house, warning Rayan of the impending attack did not exempt Israeli forces from responsibility for the civilian deaths. The Israeli government said the object of the attack was Rayan's house, not Rayan himself, as the home allegedly contained weapons. Amnesty International wrote that Israel must have known women and children would be at home, given the schools were closed. IDF stated its surveillance showed people leaving the house, but Amnesty noted Israel had failed to provide any evidence to substantiate that claim.

Rayan was the most senior Hamas member killed in a targeted killing since Abdel Aziz al-Rantissi was killed by an Israeli Apache helicopter strike in 2004. Hamas said that Israel would pay a "heavy price" for his death.
