= Omdurman Islamic University =

Islamic university in Omdurman, Sudan

Omdurman Islamic University جامعة أم درمان الإسلامية
- Type: Public
- Established: 1901; 125 years ago
- President: Professor Hassan Abbas preceded by Prof. Mohammed Osman Salih
- Location: Omdurman, Sudan; 15.5736°N 32.4496°E
- Website: www.oiu.edu.sd

Omdurman Islamic University (OIU; Arabic: جامعة أم درمان الإسلامية) is a university built on an area of size about 800 feddans (3,360,000 square meters (830 acres)) in Omdurman, Sudan. While the school is primarily oriented toward Islamic studies, it serves other fields of studies as well, such as engineering, agriculture and medicine. Omdurman Islamic University is a member of the Federation of the Universities of the Islamic World.

== History ==
Omdurman Islamic University was previously known as the Omdurman Scientific Institute. The Omdurman Scientific Institute was the first private scientific institute established in modern Sudan, and many prominent Sudanese scholars and personalities graduated from it. Sudanese scholars asked the colonial government at the time to establish the Omdurman Scientific Institute, which was accepted, and so the institute was established in 1912 as a response to rising foreign education. The institute represents the beginning of regular religious education in Sudan, which adopted the Al-Azhar system. The scientific institute developed in the mid-1960s to later become Omdurman Islamic University in 1965.

== Faculties ==
Omdurman Islamic University offers various faculties, which are listed below.

- Faculty of Medicine and Health Sciences
- Faculty of Sciences and Technology
- Faculty of Engineering Sciences
- Faculty of Agriculture
- Faculty of Pharmacy
- Faculty of Sharia and Law
- Faculty of Medical Laboratories Sciences
- Faculty of Economics
- Faculty of Media
- Faculty of Education
- Faculty of Computer and Information Technology

== Notable alumni ==
During its time, the Omdurman Islamic University has educated various notable alumni, who are listed below.

- Elhadi Adam, Sudanese poet and songwriter
- Shaleh Muhamad Aldjufri, Indonesian politician
- Guled Salah Barre, Somali politician
- Hamid Choi, South Korean translator and professor
- Abdulcadir Gabeire Farah, Somali-born Polish historian and social activist
- Nizar Rayan, high-ranking Hamas leader and professor
- Ali al-Sallabi, Libyan historian, religious scholar and politician
- Mohammed Adam El-Sheikh, Sudanese American executive director of the Fiqh Council of North America
- Abdul Somad, Indonesian Islamic preacher and scholar

== See also ==
- List of Islamic educational institutions
- Education in Sudan
