= Palu Bay =

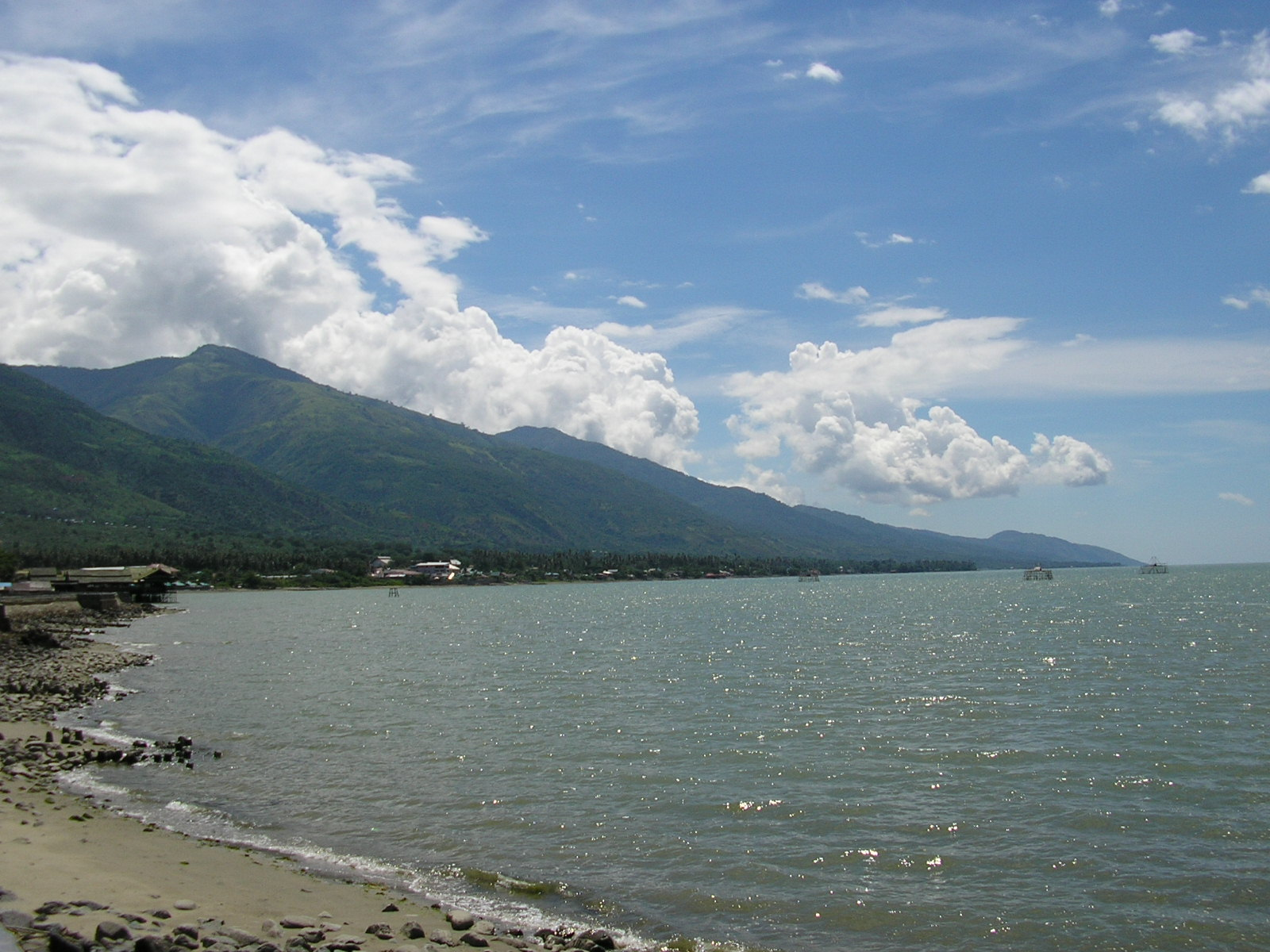
- Palu Bay, Central Sulawesi, Indonesia

- Location within Sulawesi
- Location: Sulawesi, Indonesia
- Coordinates: 0°6′45″S 119°49′44″E
- Type: Bay
- Basin countries: Indonesia

Palu Bay (Indonesian: Teluk Palu) is located on the north coast of Sulawesi in the Indonesian province of Central Sulawesi.

== Geography ==
The bay opens to the north of the Makassar Strait. The south and parts of the east coast belong to the city of Palu, while the west coast and the north east coast are part of the Donggala Regency. Its administrative seat in Banawa (Donggala) is in the north of the west coast, which ends in the Tanjung Karang peninsula. The Palu River flows into the bay on the south bank. The center of Palu is also located here. The shore of the bay was hit by a tsunami up to six meters high on 28 September, after the Sulawesi earthquake in 2018, which caused great damage.
