= Sultan Syarif Kasim II State Islamic University =

Public university in Pekanbaru, Riau, Indonesia

Sultan Syarif Kasim State Islamic University in Riau
- Universitas Islam Negeri Sultan Syarif Kasim Riau
- Type: Public
- Established: January 4, 2005
- Rector: Prof. Dr. H. Munzir Hitami, M.A
- Location: HR. Soebrantas Street, No. 155, Km 15, Simpang Baru Panam, Pekanbaru, Riau, Indonesia, Pekanbaru, Riau, Indonesia
- Colors: Green and White
- Nickname: UIN Suska
- Website: www.uin-suska.ac.id/

Sultan Syarif Kasim State Islamic University in Riau (Indonesian: Universitas Islam Negeri Sultan Syarif Kasim Riau) is a public university in Pekanbaru, Riau, Indonesia. It was established on January 4, 2005. Before 2005, its name was IAIN Sultan Syarif Kasim Riau and changed by Religion Ministry of Indonesia's Decree No.8 of 2005. Its current rector is Prof. Dr. H. Munzir Hitami, M.A.

== Schools ==
State Islamic University of Sultan Syarif Kasim Riau has 9 faculties:

1. Faculty of Tarbiyah and Keguruan
2. Faculty of Syari’ah and Law
3. Faculty of Ushuluddin
4. Faculty of Dakwah dan Communication
5. Faculty of Science and Technology
6. Faculty of Psychology
7. Faculty of Economy and Social
8. Faculty of Agriculture and Farms
9. Masters and Doctoral Programs
