= Alkhairaat =

Islamic organization based in Palu, Central Sulawesi, Indonesia

- الخيرات
- Formation: June 30, 1930; 96 years ago
- Founder: Sayyid Idrus bin Salim al-Jufri
- Founded at: Palu, Indonesia
- Type: Religious organization
- Purpose: Religion, Education, Social & Dawah
- Headquarters: Jl. SIS Aljufri No. 44, Palu, 94111, Indonesia
- Coordinates: 0.898503°S 119.859130°E
- Region served: Indonesia
- Members: 18 million (2010)
- Supreme head: Sayyid Saggaf bin Muhammad Aljufri
- General head: Sayyid Ali bin Muhammad Aljufri
- Secretary general: Drs. H. Ridwan Yalidjama
- Subsidiaries: Alkhairaat University
- Website: alkhairaat.sch.id

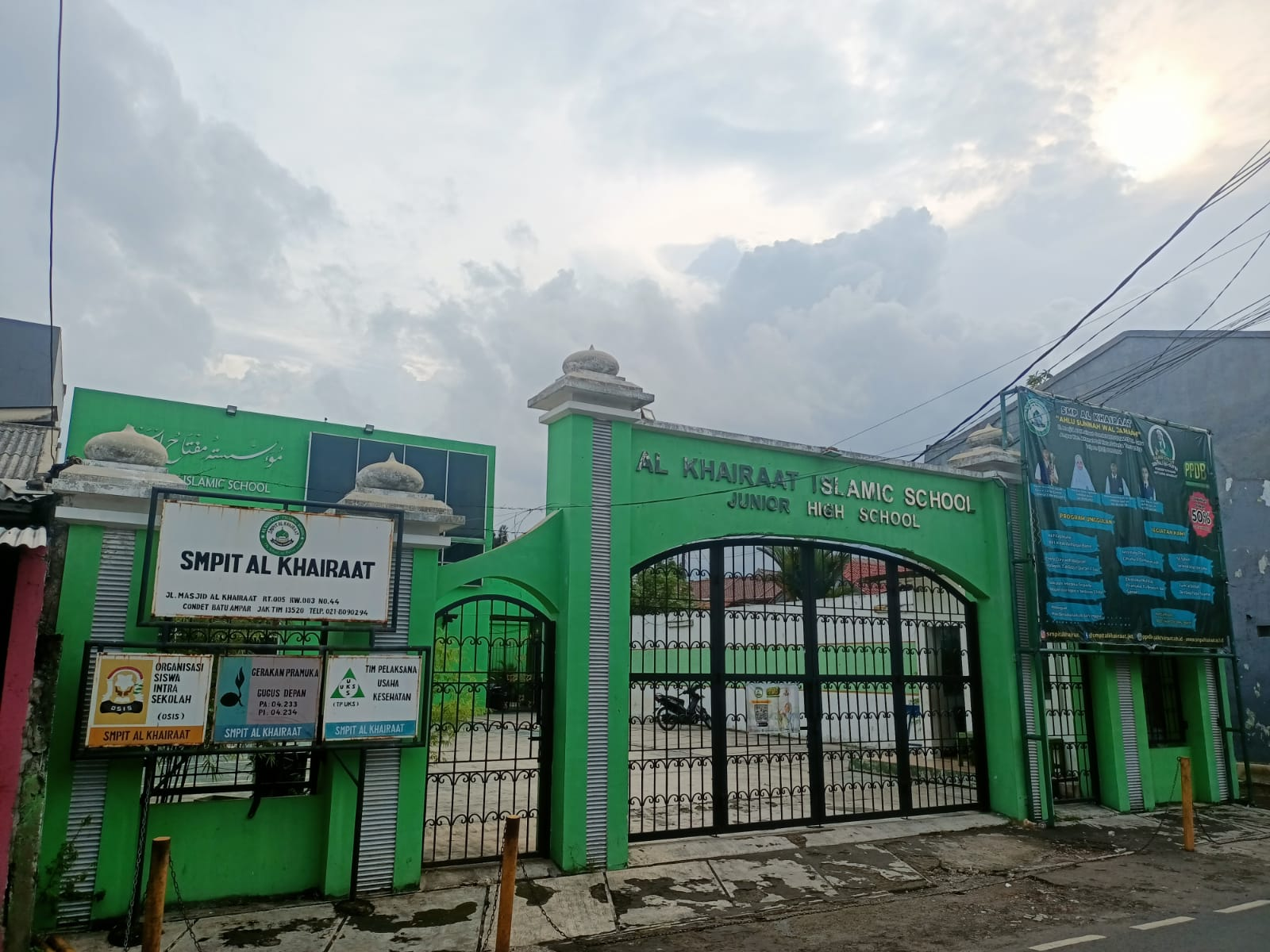
Junior high school belongs to Alkhairaat community organization in Condet area of Jakarta

Alkhairaat (Arabic: الخيرات, romanized: al-Ḵayrāt, Arabic pronunciation: [al‿xajraːt], "good things") is the largest Islamic community organization in eastern Indonesia based in Palu, Central Sulawesi. This organization was founded by an Arab Indonesian cleric who was born in Hadhramaut named Habib Sayyid Idrus bin Salim al-Jufri on June 30, 1930; 96 years ago.
