= Palu River =

River in Sulawesi, Indonesia

Coordinates: 0°52′00″S 119°51′28″E

Palu River Sungai Palu, Salo Paloe, Binangga Palu, Sungai Miu
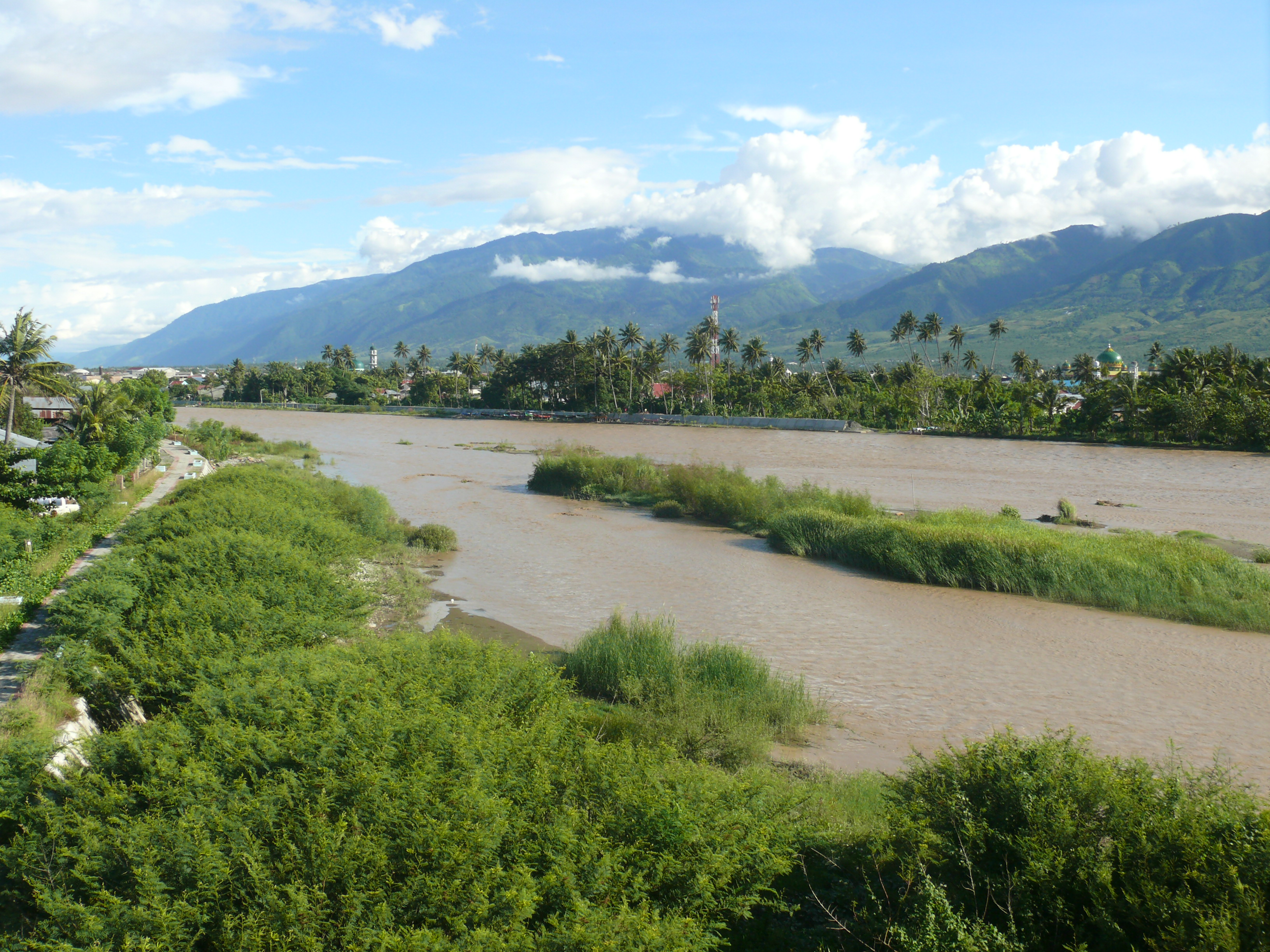
- Palu River in 2010

- Location of river mouth Palu River (Indonesia)

Location
- Country: Indonesia

Physical characteristics
- Source
  - location: Sulawesi
- Mouth
  - location: at Palu into Makassar Strait
  - elevation: Sea level
- Length: 90 km (56 mi)
- Basin size: 2,694 km^{2} (1,040 sq mi)
- Discharge
  - average: 61.2 m^{3}/s (2,160 cu ft/s)

Basin features
- Tributaries
  - right: Gumbasa River

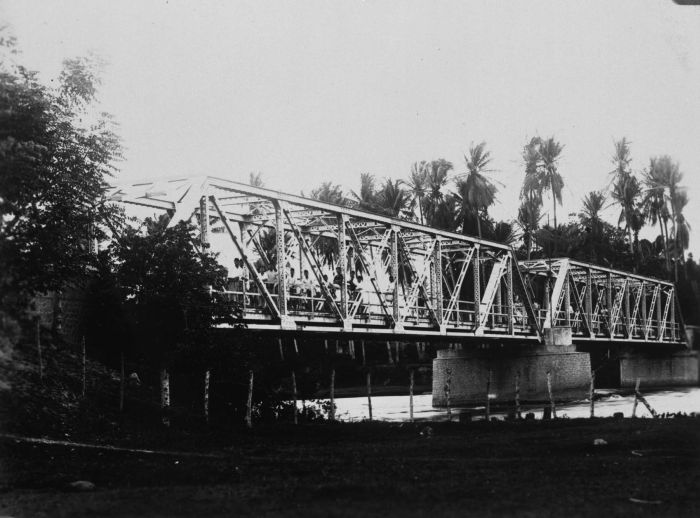
Bridge over the Palu River (1930–1936)

The Palu River (Indonesian: Sungai Palu) is a river in Central Sulawesi, Sulawesi island, Indonesia, about 1600 km northeast of the capital Jakarta.

== Hydrology ==
The river flows through the city of Palu, with 41% of the basin area covered by the protected tropical montane forest of the Lore Lindu National Park.

== Geography ==
The river flows in the west area of Sulawesi with predominantly tropical rainforest climate (designated as Af in the Köppen-Geiger climate classification). The annual average temperature in the area is about 24 °C. The warmest month is October, when the average temperature is around 26 °C, and the coldest is July, at 22 °C. The average annual rainfall is 2092 mm. The wettest month is August, with an average of 252 mm rainfall, and the driest is February, with 114 mm rainfall.

Palu River

Climate chart (precipitation, max. and min. temperature)
J	F	M	A	M	J	J	A	S	O	N	D
164 26 21	114 27 20	132 29 20	218 25 22	218 27 21	183 26 20	239 26 19	252 27 22	118 29 20	129 30 21	149 27 20	175 31 21
- █ Average max. and min. temperatures in °C
- █ Precipitation totals in mm
Imperial conversion
J	F	M	A	M	J	J	A	S	O	N	D
6.5 79 70	4.5 81 68	5.2 84 68	8.6 77 72	8.6 81 70	7.2 79 68	9.4 79 66	9.9 81 72	4.6 84 68	5.1 86 70	5.9 81 68	6.9 88 70
- █ Average max. and min. temperatures in °F
- █ Precipitation totals in inches

== See also ==
- List of drainage basins of Indonesia
- List of rivers of Indonesia
- List of rivers of Sulawesi
