= Piling =

Type of foundation

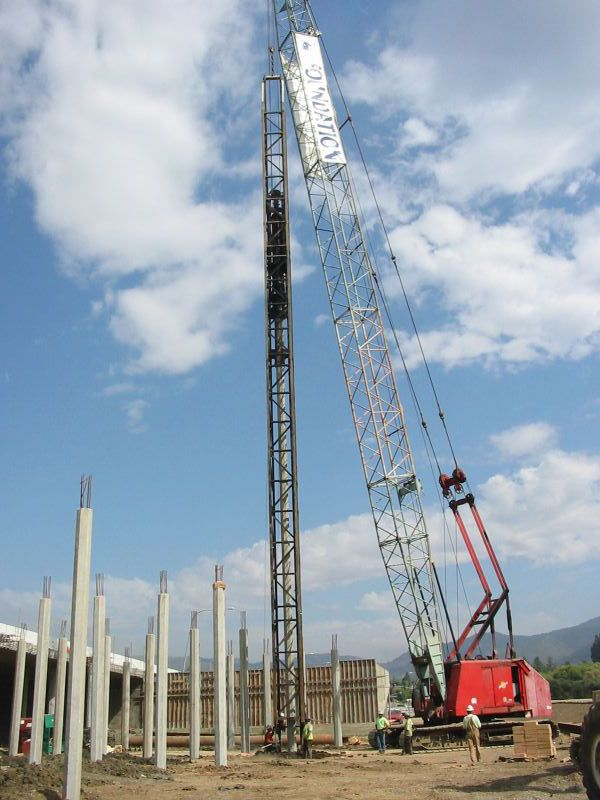
A deep foundation installation for a bridge in Napa, California, United States

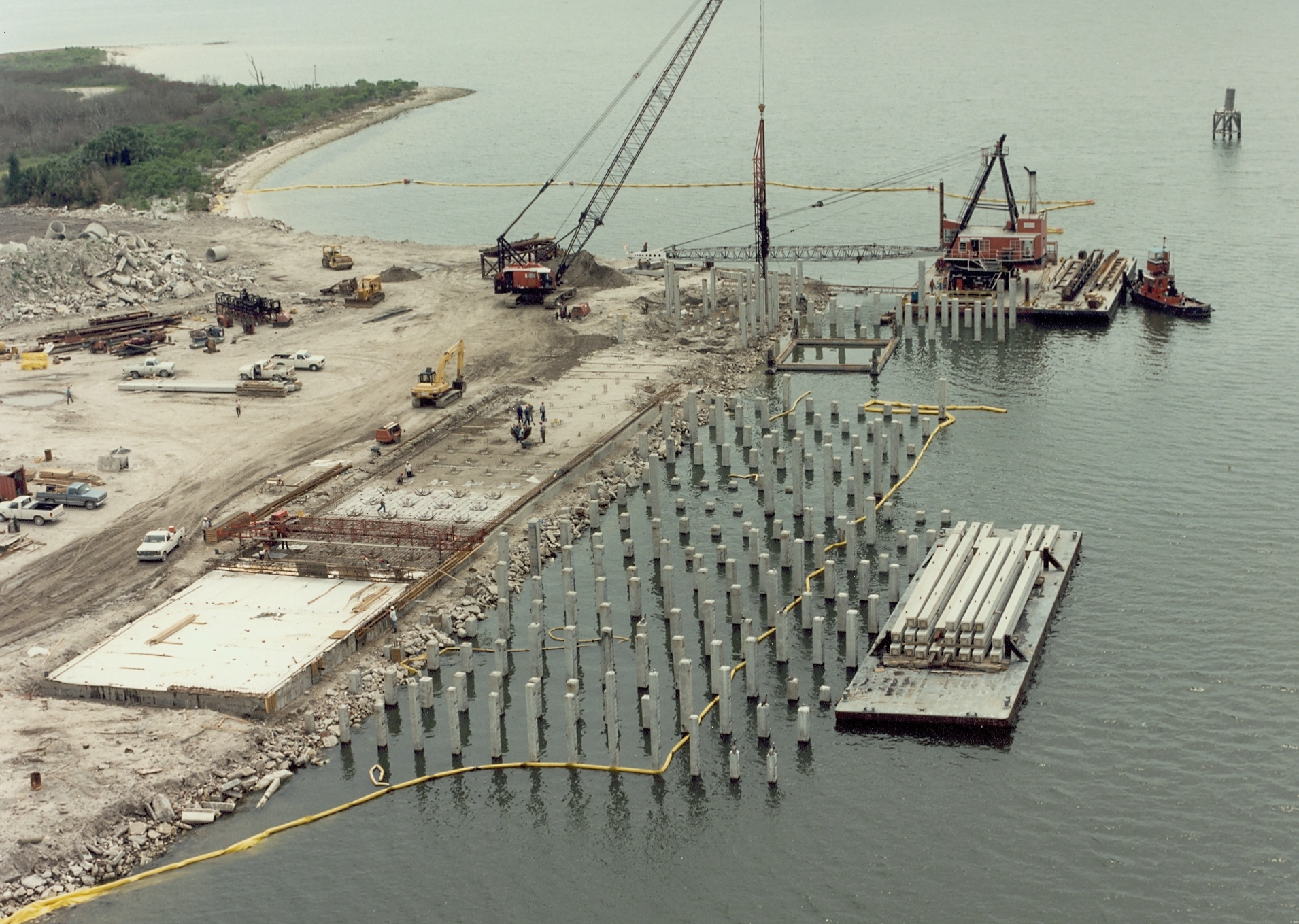
Pile driving operations in the Port of Tampa, Florida

A pile or piling is a vertical structural element of a deep foundation, driven or drilled deep into the ground at the building site. A deep foundation is a type of foundation that transfers building loads to the earth farther down from the surface than a shallow foundation does to a subsurface layer or a range of depths.

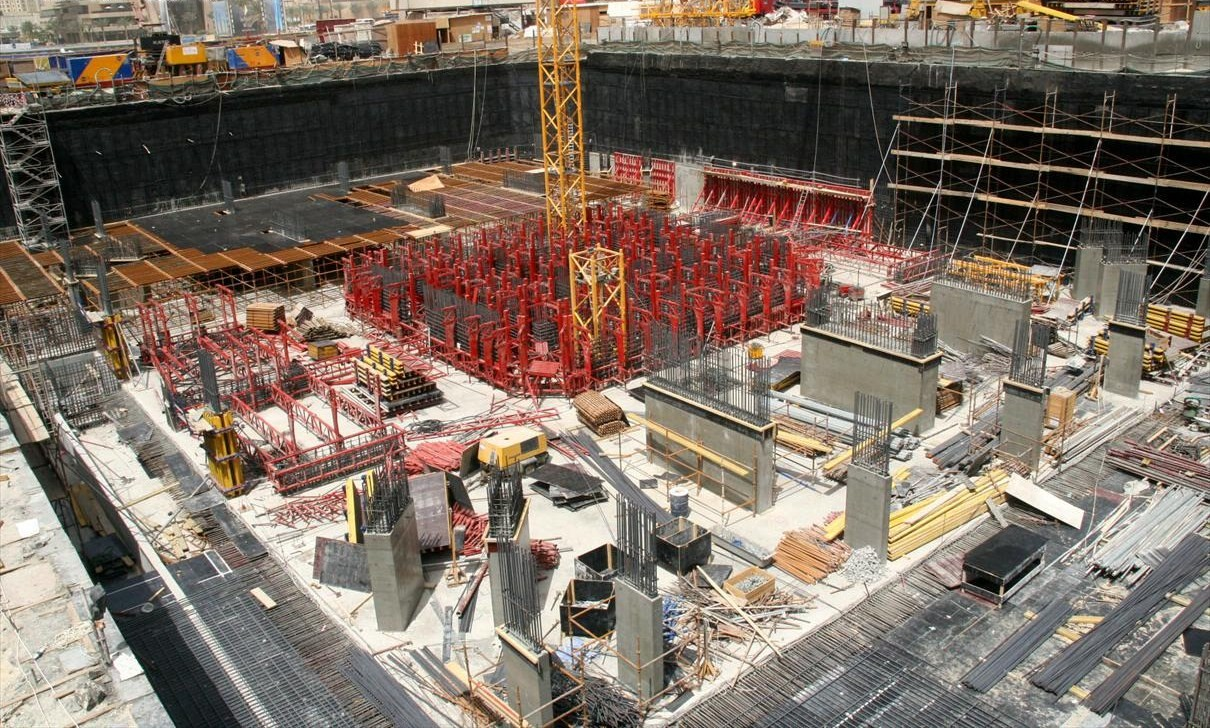
Deep foundations of The Marina Torch, a skyscraper in Dubai

There are many reasons that a geotechnical engineer would recommend a deep foundation over a shallow foundation, such as for a skyscraper. Some of the common reasons are very large design loads, a poor soil at shallow depth, or site constraints like property lines. There are different terms used to describe different types of deep foundations including the pile (which is analogous to a pole), the pier (which is analogous to a column), drilled shafts, and caissons. Piles are generally driven into the ground in situ; other deep foundations are typically put in place using excavation and drilling. The naming conventions may vary between engineering disciplines and firms. Deep foundations can be made out of timber, steel, reinforced concrete or prestressed concrete.

== Driven foundations ==
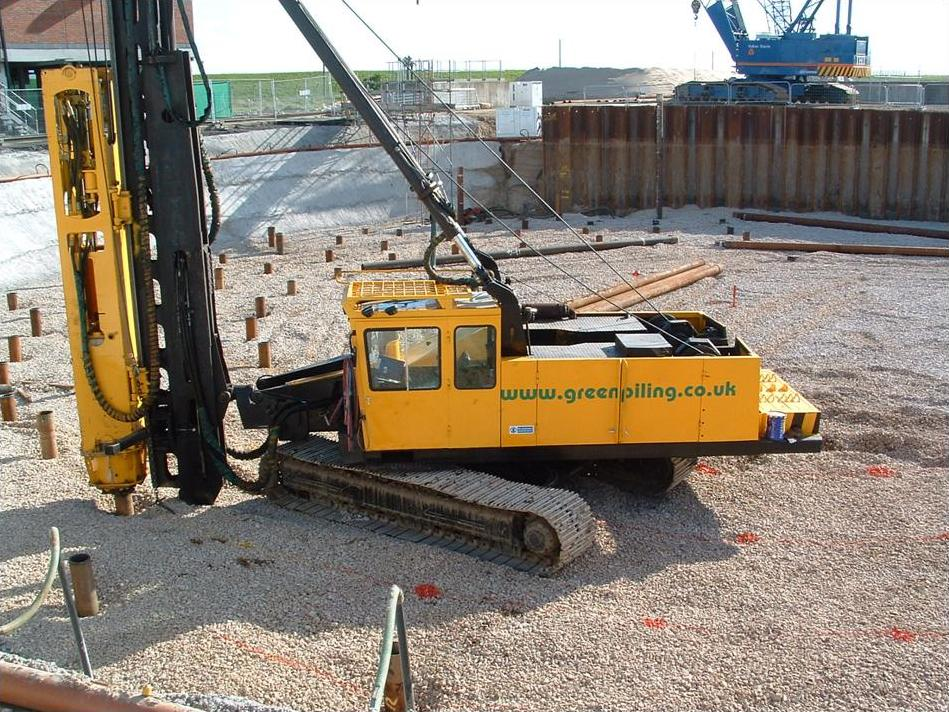
Pipe piles being driven into the ground

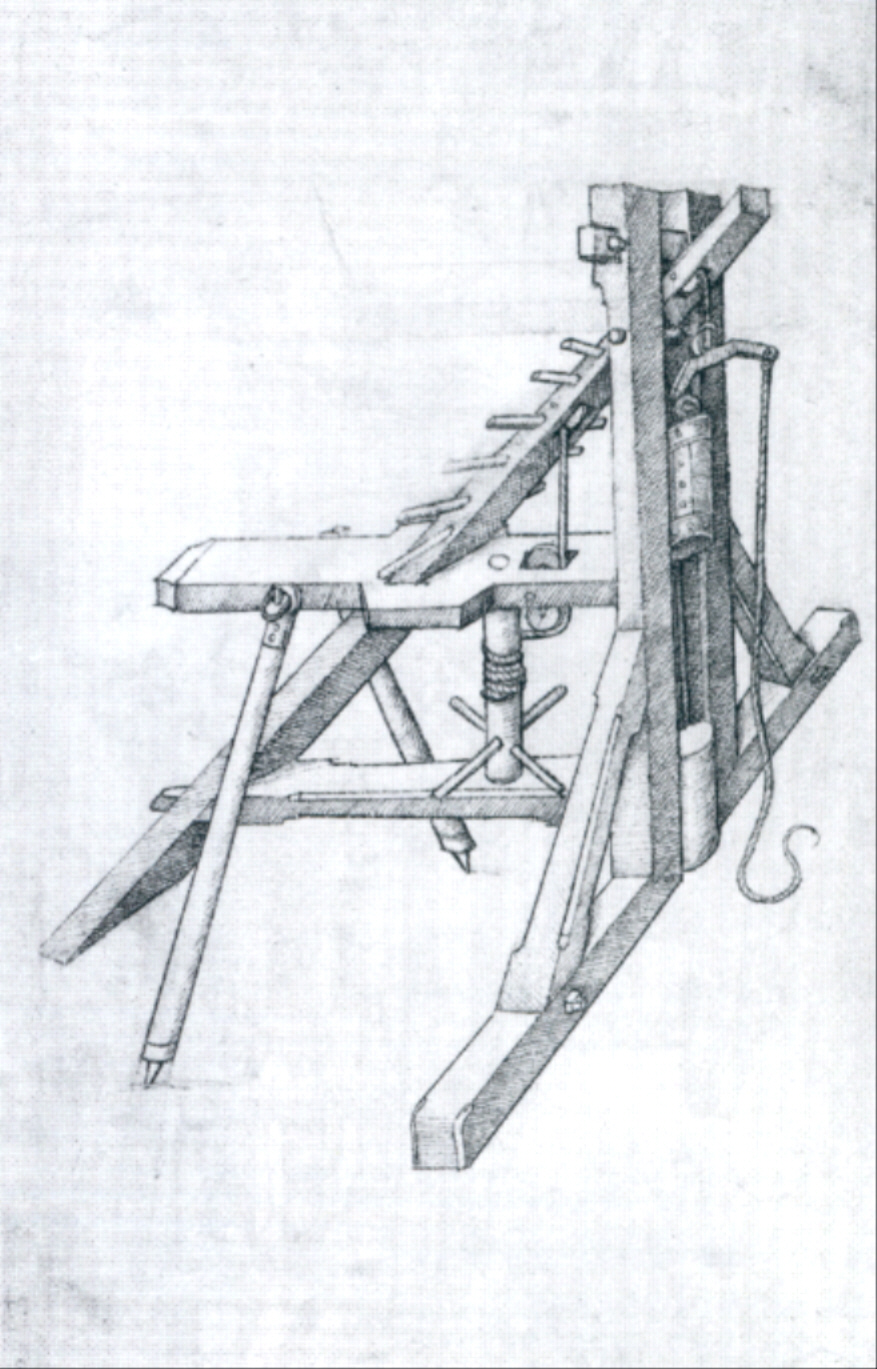
Illustration of a hand-operated pile driver in Germany after 1480

Prefabricated piles are driven into the ground using a pile driver. Driven piles are constructed of wood, reinforced concrete, or steel. Wooden piles are made from the trunks of tall trees. Concrete piles are available in square, octagonal, and round cross-sections (like Franki piles). They are reinforced with rebar and are often prestressed. Steel piles are either pipe piles or some sort of beam section (like an H-pile). Historically, wood piles used splices to join multiple segments end-to-end when the driven depth required was too long for a single pile; today, splicing is common with steel piles, though concrete piles can be spliced with mechanical and other means. Driving piles, as opposed to drilling shafts, is advantageous because the soil displaced by driving the piles compresses the surrounding soil, causing greater friction against the sides of the piles, thus increasing their load-bearing capacity. Driven piles are also considered to be "tested" for weight-bearing ability because of their method of installation.

=== Pile foundation systems ===
Foundations relying on driven piles often have groups of piles connected by a pile cap (a large concrete block into which the heads of the piles are embedded) to distribute loads that are greater than one pile can bear. Pile caps and isolated piles are typically connected with grade beams to tie the foundation elements together; lighter structural elements bear on the grade beams, while heavier elements bear directly on the pile cap.

Pile foundation systems are deep foundation solutions used to transfer building loads through weak or unstable ground to stronger, more stable soil or rock layers below. They involve driving or drilling long, column-like elements, known as piles, into the ground to support structures above. Ideal for sites with soft, compressible, or variable soils, pile foundations provide strength, stability, and reduced settlement, making them essential for many modern construction projects.

=== Monopile foundation ===
A monopile foundation utilizes a single, generally large-diameter, foundation structural element to support all the loads (weight, wind, etc.) of a large above-surface structure.

A large number of monopile foundations have been utilized in recent years for economically constructing fixed-bottom offshore wind farms in shallow-water subsea locations. For example, the Horns Rev wind farm in the North Sea west of Denmark utilizes 80 large monopiles of 4 metres diameter sunk 25 meters deep into the seabed, while the Lynn and Inner Dowsing Wind Farm off the coast of England went online in 2008 with over 100 turbines, each mounted on a 4.7-metre-diameter monopile foundation in ocean depths up to 18 metres.

The typical construction process for a wind turbine subsea monopile foundation in sand includes driving a large hollow steel pile, of some 4 m in diameter with approximately 50mm thick walls, some 25 m deep into the seabed, through a 0.5 m layer of larger stone and gravel to minimize erosion around the pile. A transition piece (complete with pre-installed features such as boat-landing arrangement, cathodic protection, cable ducts for sub-marine cables, turbine tower flange, etc.) is attached to the driven pile, and the sand and water are removed from the centre of the pile and replaced with concrete. An additional layer of even larger stone, up to 0.5 m diameter, is applied to the surface of the seabed for longer-term erosion protection.

== Drilled pile ==
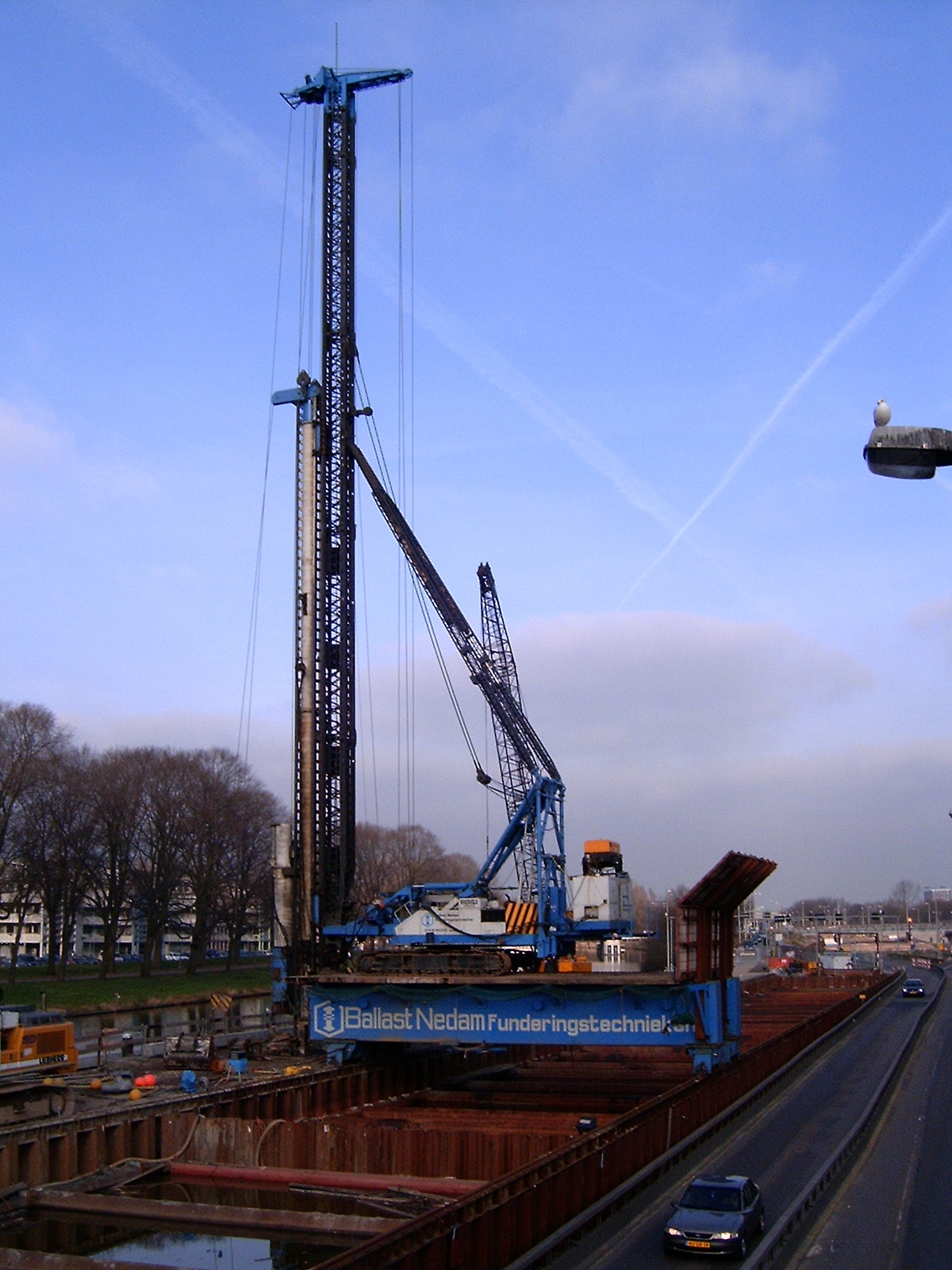
A pile machine in Amsterdam

Also called caissons, drilled shafts, drilled piers, cast-in-drilled-hole piles (CIDH piles) or cast-in-situ piles, a borehole is drilled into the ground, then concrete (and often some sort of reinforcing) is placed into the borehole to form the pile. Rotary boring techniques allow larger diameter piles than any other piling method and permit pile construction through particularly dense or hard strata. Construction methods depend on the geology of the site; in particular, whether boring is to be undertaken in 'dry' ground conditions or through water-saturated strata. Casing is often used when the sides of the borehole are likely to slough off before concrete is poured.

For end-bearing piles, drilling continues until the borehole has extended a sufficient depth (socketing) into a sufficiently strong layer. Depending on site geology, this can be a rock layer, or hardpan, or other dense, strong layers. Both the diameter of the pile and the depth of the pile are highly specific to the ground conditions, loading conditions, and nature of the project. Pile depths may vary substantially across a project if the bearing layer is not level. Drilled piles can be tested using a variety of methods to verify the pile integrity during installation.

=== Under-reamed pile ===
Under-reamed piles have mechanically formed enlarged bases that are as much as 6 m in diameter. The form is that of an inverted cone and can only be formed in stable soils or rocks. The larger base diameter allows greater bearing capacity than a straight-shaft pile.

These piles are suited for expansive soils which are often subjected to seasonal moisture variations, or for loose or soft strata. They are used in normal ground condition also where economics are favorable.

Under reamed piles foundation is used for the following soils:

- Black cotton soil. This type of soil expands when it comes in contact with water and contraction occurs when water is removed. So that cracks appear in the construction done on such clay. An under reamed pile is used in the base to remove this defect.
- Low bearing capacity Outdated soil (filled soil)
- Sandy soil when water table is high.
- Where lifting forces appear at the base of foundation.

=== Augercast pile ===
An augercast pile, often known as a continuous flight augering (CFA) pile, is formed by drilling into the ground with a hollow stemmed continuous flight auger to the required depth or degree of resistance. No casing is required. A cement grout mix is then pumped down the stem of the auger. While the cement grout is pumped, the auger is slowly withdrawn, conveying the soil upward along the flights. A shaft of fluid cement grout is formed to ground level. Reinforcement can be installed. Recent innovations in addition to stringent quality control allows reinforcing cages to be placed up to the full length of a pile when required.

Augercast piles cause minimal disturbance and are often used for noise-sensitive and environmentally-sensitive sites. Augercast piles are not generally suited for use in contaminated soils, because of expensive waste disposal costs. In cases such as these, a displacement pile (like Olivier piles) may provide the cost efficiency of an augercast pile and minimal environmental impact. In ground containing obstructions or cobbles and boulders, augercast piles are less suitable as refusal above the design pile tip elevation may be encountered.

Small Sectional Flight Auger piling rigs can also be used for piled raft foundations. These produce the same type of pile as a Continuous Flight Auger rig but using smaller, more lightweight equipment. This piling method is fast, cost-effective and suitable for the majority of ground types.

=== Pier and grade beam foundation ===
In drilled pier foundations, the piers can be connected with grade beams on which the structure sits, sometimes with heavy column loads bearing directly on the piers. In some residential construction, the piers are extended above the ground level, and wood beams bearing on the piers are used to support the structure. This type of foundation results in a crawl space underneath the building in which wiring and duct work can be laid during construction or re-modelling.

== Speciality piles ==
=== Jet-pile ===
In jet piling high pressure water is used to set piles. High pressure water cuts through soil with a high-pressure jet flow and allows the pile to be fitted. One advantage of Jet Piling: the water jet lubricates the pile and softens the ground. The method is in use in Norway.

=== Micropile ===
Micropiles are small diameter, generally less than 300mm diameter, elements that are drilled and grouted in place. They typically get their capacity from skin friction along the sides of the element, but can be end bearing in hard rock as well. Micropiles are usually heavily reinforced with steel comprising more than 40% of their cross section. They can be used as direct structural support or as ground reinforcement elements. Due to their relatively high cost and the type of equipment used to install these elements, they are often used where access restrictions and or very difficult ground conditions (cobbles and boulders, construction debris, karst, environmental sensitivity) exists or to retrofit existing structures. Occasionally, in difficult ground, they are used for new construction foundation elements. Typical applications include underpinning, bridge, transmission tower and slope stabilization projects.

=== Tripod pile ===
The use of a tripod rig to install piles is one of the more traditional ways of forming piles. Although unit costs are generally higher than with most other forms of piling, it has several advantages which have ensured its continued use through to the present day. The tripod system is easy and inexpensive to bring to site, making it ideal for jobs with a small number of piles.

=== Sheet pile ===
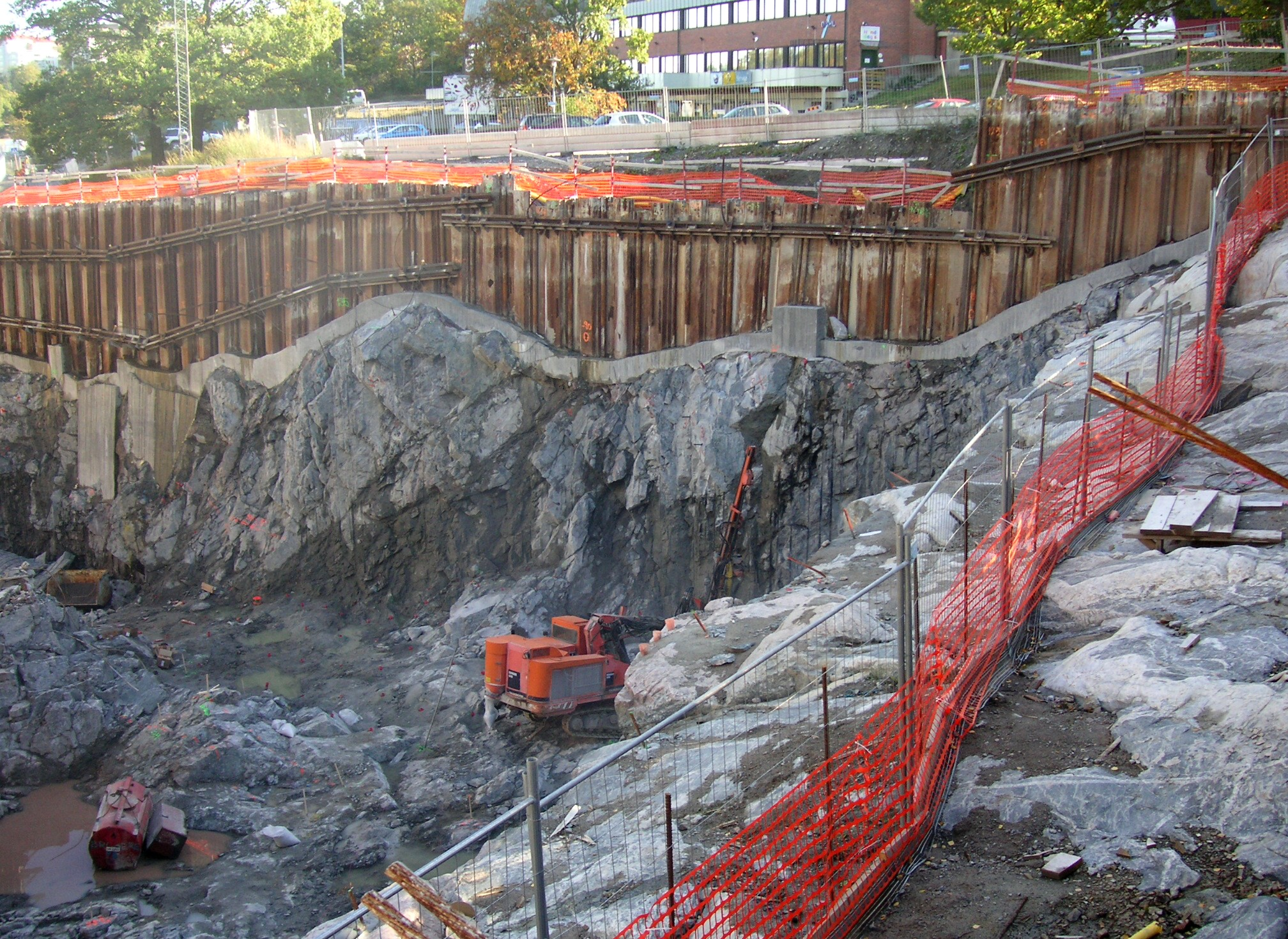
Sheet piles are used to restrain soft soil above the bedrock in this excavation.

Sheet piling is a form of driven piling using thin interlocking sheets of steel to obtain a continuous barrier in the ground. The main application of sheet piles is in retaining walls and cofferdams erected to enable permanent works to proceed. Normally, vibrating hammer, t-crane and crawle drilling are used to establish sheet piles.

=== Soldier pile ===
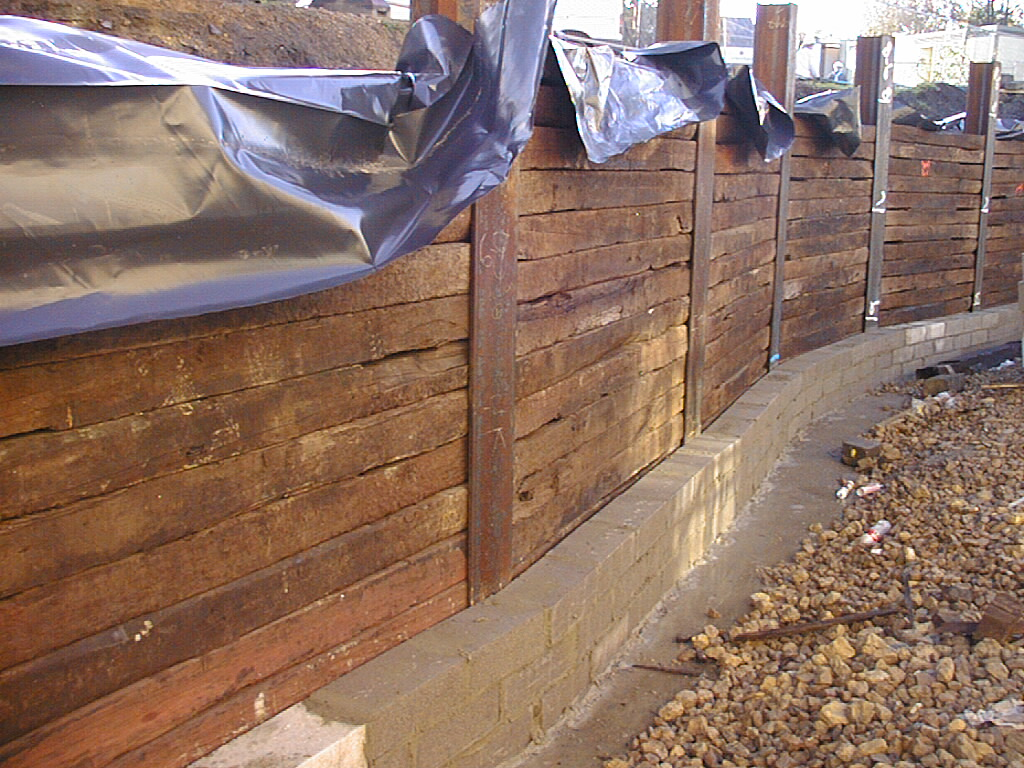
A soldier pile wall using reclaimed railway sleepers as lagging

Soldier piles wall

Soldier piles, also known as king piles or Berlin walls, are constructed of steel H sections spaced about 2 to 3 m apart and are driven or drilled prior to excavation. As the excavation proceeds, horizontal timber sheeting (lagging) is inserted behind the H pile flanges.

The horizontal earth pressures are concentrated on the soldier piles because of their relative rigidity compared to the lagging. Soil movement and subsidence is minimized by installing the lagging immediately after excavation to avoid soil loss. Lagging can be constructed by timber, precast concrete, shotcrete and steel plates depending on spacing of the soldier piles and the type of soils.

Soldier piles are most suitable in conditions where well constructed walls will not result in subsidence such as over-consolidated clays, soils above the water table if they have some cohesion, and free draining soils which can be effectively dewatered, like sands.

Unsuitable soils include soft clays and weak running soils that allow large movements such as loose sands. It is also not possible to extend the wall beyond the bottom of the excavation, and dewatering is often required.

=== Screw pile ===
Screw piles, also called helical piers and screw foundations, have been used as foundations since the mid 19th century in screw-pile lighthouses. Screw piles are galvanized iron pipe with helical fins that are turned into the ground by machines to the required depth. The screw distributes the load to the soil and is sized accordingly.

=== Suction pile ===
Suction piles are used underwater to secure floating platforms. Tubular piles are driven into the seabed (or more commonly dropped a few metres into a soft seabed) and then a pump sucks water out at the top of the tubular, pulling the pile further down.

The proportions of the pile (diameter to height) are dependent upon the soil type. Sand is difficult to penetrate but provides good holding capacity, so the height may be as short as half the diameter. Clays and muds are easy to penetrate but provide poor holding capacity, so the height may be as much as eight times the diameter. The open nature of gravel means that water would flow through the ground during installation, causing 'piping' flow (where water boils up through weaker paths through the soil). Therefore, suction piles cannot be used in gravel seabeds.

=== Adfreeze pile ===
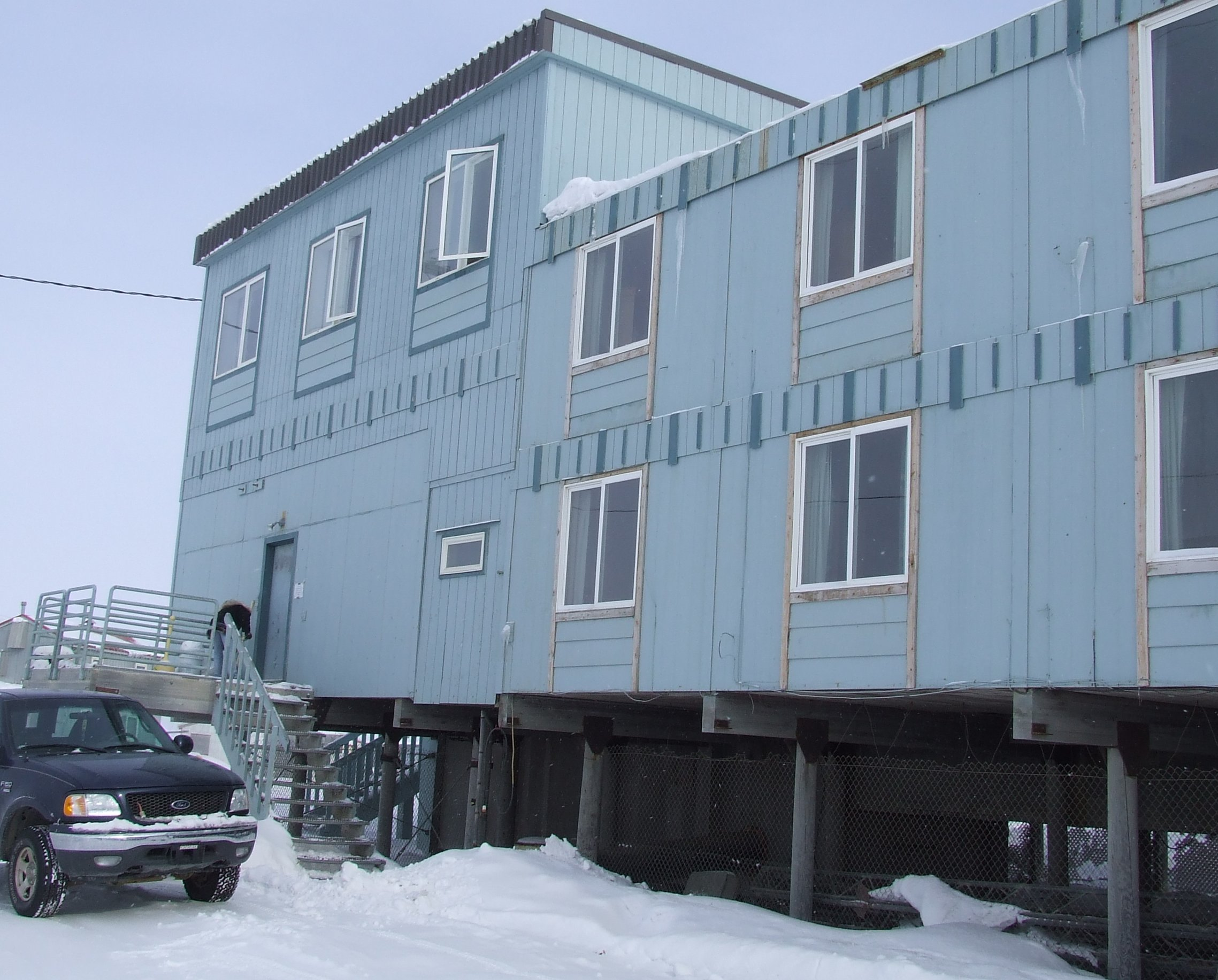
Adfreeze piles supporting a building in Utqiaġvik, Alaska

In high latitudes where the ground is continuously frozen, adfreeze piles are used as the primary structural foundation method.

Adfreeze piles derive their strength from the bond of the frozen ground around them to the surface of the pile.

Adfreeze pile foundations are particularly sensitive in conditions which cause the permafrost to melt. If a building is constructed improperly then it can melt the ground below, resulting in a failure of the foundation system.

=== Vibrated stone columns ===
Vibrated stone columns are a ground improvement technique where columns of coarse aggregate are placed in soils with poor drainage or bearing capacity to improve the soils.

=== Hospital pile ===
Specific to marine structures, hospital piles (also known as gallow piles) are built to provide temporary support to marine structure components during refurbishment works. For example, when removing a river pontoon, the brow will be attached to hospital pile to support it. They are normal piles, usually with a chain or hook attachment.

== Piled walls ==
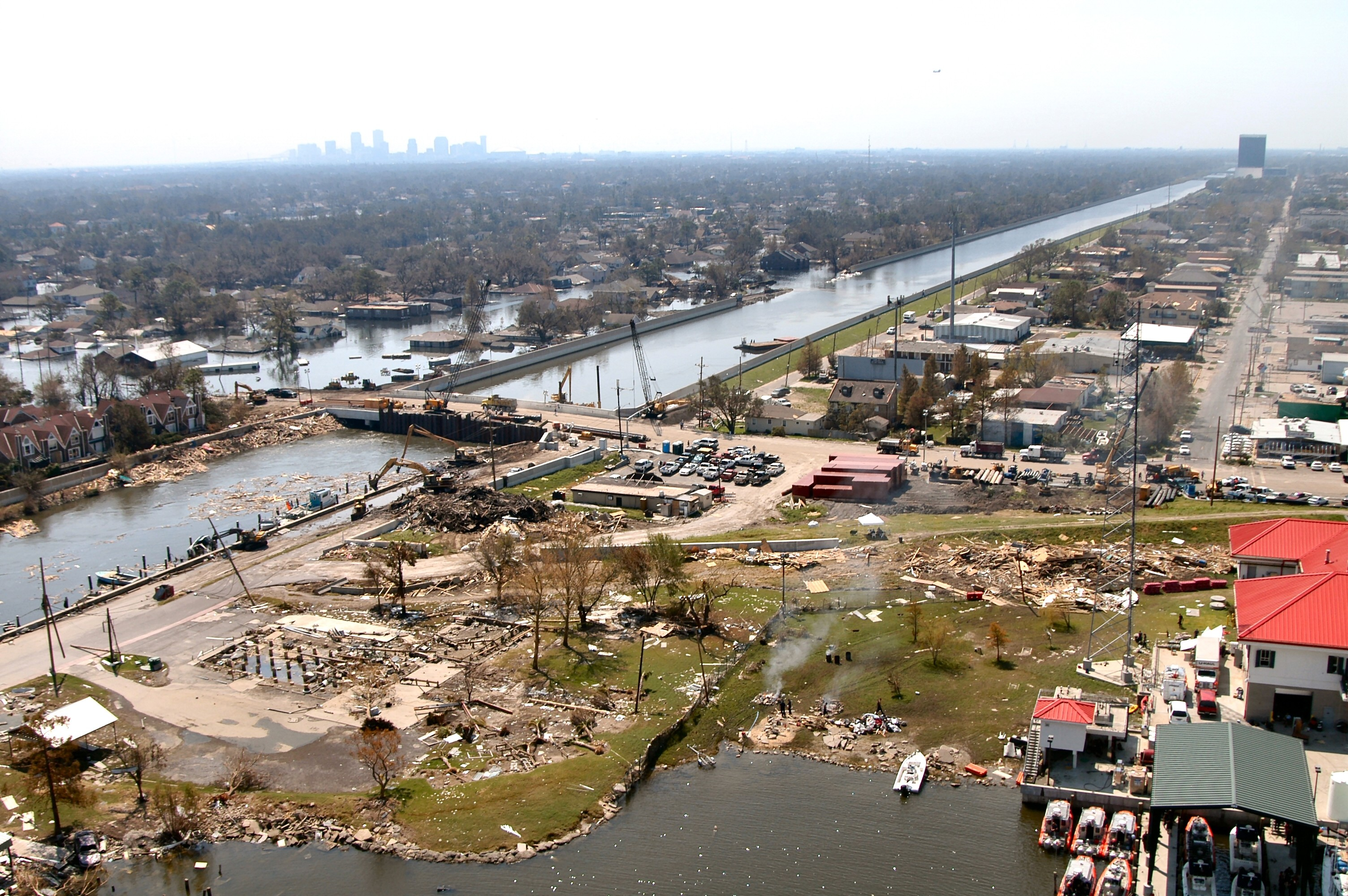
Sheet piling placed in front of a bridge damaged by Hurricane Katrina, used as a dam to block a canal in New Orleans, Louisiana

Piled walls can be driven or bored. They provide special advantages where available working space dictates and open cut excavation not feasible. Both methods offer technically effective and offer a cost-efficient temporary or permanent means of retaining the sides of bulk excavations even in water-bearing strata. When used in permanent works, these walls can be designed to resist vertical loads in addition lateral load from retaining soil. Construction of both methods is the same as for foundation bearing piles. Contiguous walls are constructed with small gaps between adjacent piles. The spacing of the piles can be varied to provide suitable bending stiffness.

=== Secant piled wall ===
Secant-pile-wall

Secant pile walls are constructed such that space is left between alternate 'female' (1) piles for the subsequent construction of 'male' (2) piles. Construction of 'male' piles involves boring through the concrete in the 'female' piles hole in order to key 'male' piles between. The male pile is the one where steel reinforcement cages are installed, though in some cases the female piles are also reinforced.

Secant piled walls can be true hard/hard, hard/intermediate (firm), or hard/soft, depending on design requirements. Hard refers to structural concrete and firm or soft is usually a weaker grout mix containing bentonite. All types of wall can be constructed as free standing cantilevers, or may be propped if space and sub-structure design permit. Where party wall agreements allow, ground anchors can be used as tie backs.

=== Slurry wall ===
A slurry wall is a barrier built under ground using a mix of bentonite and water to prevent the flow of groundwater. A trench that would collapse due to the hydraulic pressure in the surrounding soil does not collapse as the slurry balances the hydraulic pressure.

== Deep mixing/mass stabilization techniques ==
These are essentially variations of in situ reinforcements in the form of piles (as mentioned above), blocks or larger volumes.

Cement, lime/quick lime, flyash, sludge and/or other binders (sometimes called stabilizer) are mixed into the soil to increase bearing capacity. The result is not as solid as concrete, but should be seen as an improvement of the bearing capacity of the original soil.

The technique is most often applied on clays or organic soils like peat. The mixing can be carried out by pumping the binder into the soil whilst mixing it with a device normally mounted on an excavator or by excavating the masses, mixing them separately with the binders and refilling them in the desired area. The technique can also be used on lightly contaminated masses as a means of binding contaminants, as opposed to excavating them and transporting to landfill or processing.

== Materials ==
=== Timber ===
As the name implies, timber piles are made of wood.

Historically, timber has been a plentiful, locally available resource in many areas. Today, timber piles are still more affordable than concrete or steel. Compared to other types of piles (steel or concrete), and depending on the source/type of timber, timber piles may not be suitable for heavier loads.

A main consideration regarding timber piles is that they should be protected from rotting above groundwater level. Timber will last for a long time below the groundwater level. For timber to rot, two elements are needed: water and oxygen. Below the groundwater level, dissolved oxygen is lacking even though there is ample water. Hence, timber tends to last for a long time below the groundwater level. An example is Venice, which has had timber pilings since its beginning; even most of the oldest piles are still in use. In 1648, the Royal Palace of Amsterdam was constructed on 13,659 timber piles that still survive today since they were below groundwater level. Timber that is to be used above the water table can be protected from decay and insects by numerous forms of wood preservation using pressure treatment (alkaline copper quaternary (ACQ), chromated copper arsenate (CCA), creosote, etc.).

Splicing timber piles is still quite common and is the easiest of all the piling materials to splice. The normal method for splicing is by driving the leader pile first, driving a steel tube (normally 60–100 cm long, with an internal diameter no smaller than the minimum toe diameter) half its length onto the end of the leader pile. The follower pile is then simply slotted into the other end of the tube and driving continues. The steel tube is simply there to ensure that the two pieces follow each other during driving. If uplift capacity is required, the splice can incorporate bolts, coach screws, spikes or the like to give it the necessary capacity.

=== Iron ===
Cast iron may be used for piling. These may be ductile.

=== Steel ===
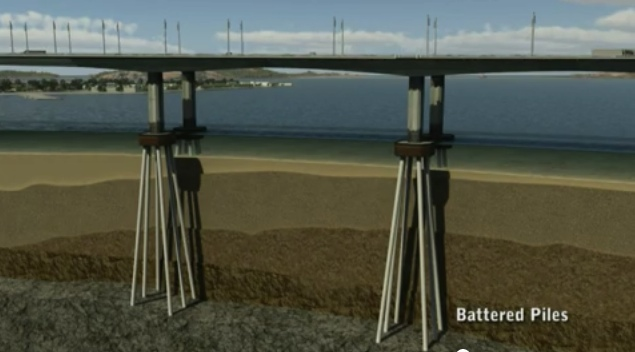
Cutaway illustration of deep inclined (battered) pipe piles supporting a precast segmented skyway where upper soil layers are weak muds.

Pipe piles are a type of steel driven pile foundation and are a good candidate for inclined (battered) piles.

Pipe piles can be driven either open end or closed end. When driven open end, soil is allowed to enter the bottom of the pipe or tube. If an empty pipe is required, a jet of water or an auger can be used to remove the soil inside following driving. Closed end pipe piles are constructed by covering the bottom of the pile with a steel plate or cast steel shoe.

In some cases, pipe piles are filled with concrete to provide additional moment capacity or corrosion resistance. In the United Kingdom, this is generally not done in order to reduce the cost. In these cases corrosion protection is provided by allowing for a sacrificial thickness of steel or by adopting a higher grade of steel. If a concrete filled pipe pile is corroded, most of the load carrying capacity of the pile will remain intact due to the concrete, while it will be lost in an empty pipe pile. The structural capacity of pipe piles is primarily calculated based on steel strength and concrete strength (if filled). An allowance is made for corrosion depending on the site conditions and local building codes. Steel pipe piles can either be new steel manufactured specifically for the piling industry or reclaimed steel tubular casing previously used for other purposes such as oil and gas exploration.

H-Piles are structural beams that are driven in the ground for deep foundation application. They can be easily cut off or joined by welding or mechanical drive-fit splicers. If the pile is driven into a soil with low pH value, then there is a risk of corrosion, coal-tar epoxy or cathodic protection can be applied to slow or eliminate the corrosion process. It is common to allow for an amount of corrosion in design by simply over dimensioning the cross-sectional area of the steel pile. In this way, the corrosion process can be prolonged up to 50 years.

=== Prestressed concrete pile ===
Concrete piles are typically made with steel reinforcing and prestressing tendons to obtain the tensile strength required, to survive handling and driving and to provide sufficient bending resistance.

Long piles can be difficult to handle and transport. Pile joints can be used to join two or more short piles to form one long pile. Pile joints can be used with both precast and prestressed concrete piles.

=== Composite pile ===
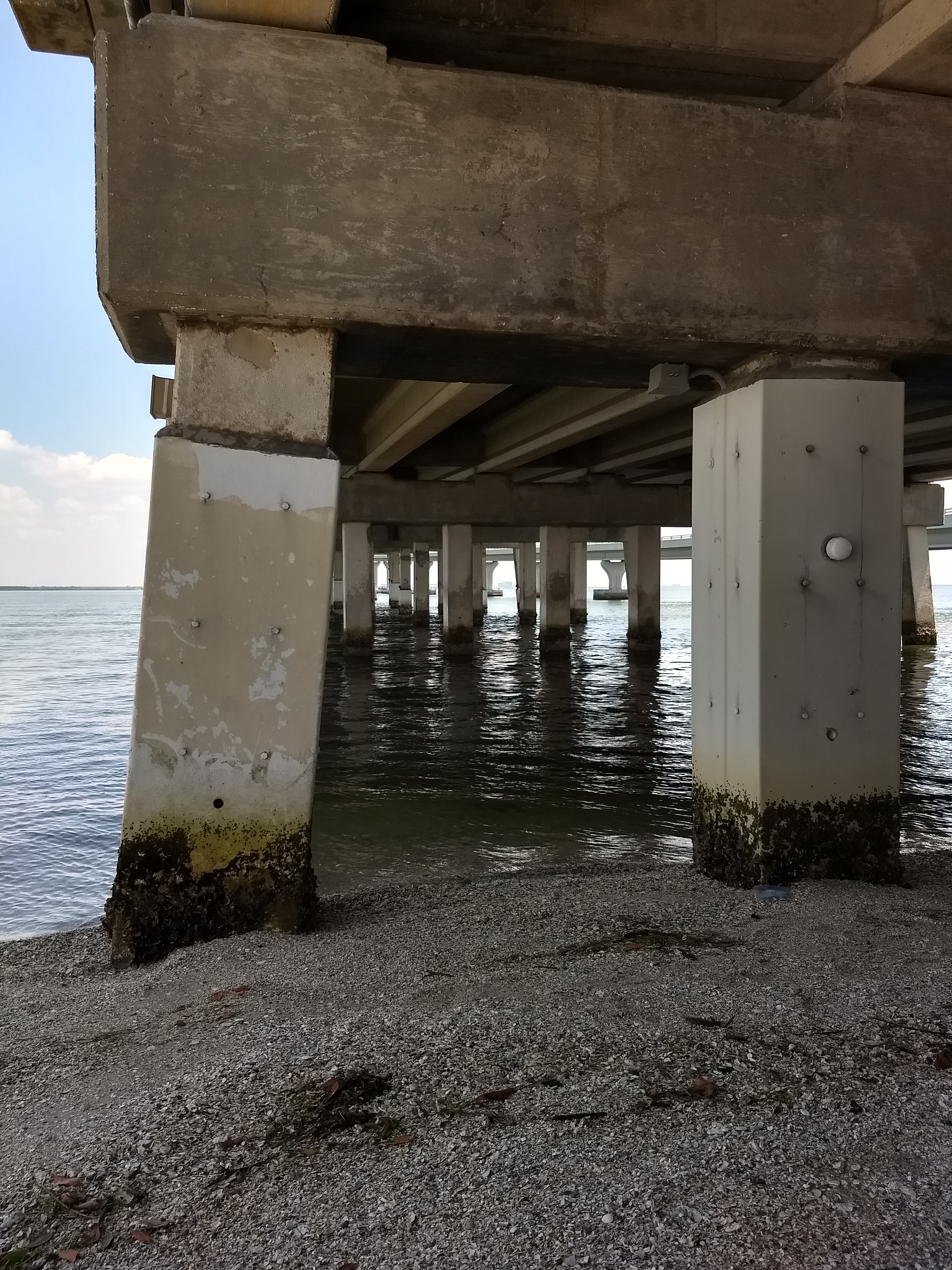
'Pile jackets' encasing old concrete piles in a saltwater environment to prevent corrosion and consequential weakening of the piles when cracks allow saltwater to contact the internal steel reinforcement rods

A "composite pile" is a pile made of steel and concrete members that are fastened together, end to end, to form a single pile. It is a combination of different materials or different shaped materials such as pipe and H-beams or steel and concrete.

== Construction machinery ==
=== For pile driving ===
Drilling deep 150 cm (59 in) diameter piles in Bridge 423 near Ness Ziona, Israel

Construction machinery used to drive piles into the ground:

- Pile driver is a device for placing piles in their designed position.
- Diesel pile hammer is a device for hammering piles into the ground.
- Hydraulic hammer is removable working equipment of hydraulic excavators, hydroficated machines (stationary rock breakers, loaders, manipulators, pile driving hammers) used for processing strong materials (rock, soil, metal) or pile driving elements by impact of falling parts dispersed by high-pressure fluid.
- Vibratory pile driver is a machine for driving piles into sandy and clay soils.
- Press-in pile driver is a machine for sinking piles into the ground by means of static force transmission.
- Universal drilling machine.

=== For pile replacement ===
Construction machinery used to construct replacement piles:

- Sectional Flight Auger or Continuous Flight Auger
- Reverse circulation drilling
- Ring bit concentric drilling

== See also ==
- Eurocode EN 1997
- International Society for Micropiles
- Post in ground construction also called earthfast or posthole construction; a historic method of building wooden structures.
- Stilt house, also known as a lake house; an ancient, historic house type built on pilings.
- Shallow foundations
- Pile bridge
- Larssen sheet piling
