= CCFA =

CCFA is an acronym which may refer to:

- Crohn's and Colitis Foundation of America

== See also ==
- CFA (disambiguation)
- CCFAN
