= CFA =

CFA may refer to:

== Agreements ==
- Canadian Football Act, a proposed 1974 law to give the Canadian Football League a government protected monopoly over professional football in Canada
- Ceasefire, a temporary agreement to stop a war
- Compact of Free Association, between the United States, Federated States of Micronesia, Marshall Islands, and Palau
- Conditional fee agreement, a payment agreement also known as "no win no fee"

== Medicine ==
- Common femoral artery
- Complete Freund's adjuvant, an immunopotentiator
- Cryptogenic fibrosing alveolitis, an archaic term for idiopathic pulmonary fibrosis

== Organizations ==
- California Faculty Association, a union for the California State University system
- Campaign for Accountability, a US ethics watchdog group
- Canadian Forestry Association
- Canadian Fraternal Association
- Carinthian Farmers' Association, a political party in Austria
- Carnegie Mellon College of Fine Arts
- Cat Fanciers' Association, a registry of pedigreed cats
- Catfish Farmers of America, a party to the Catfish Dispute
- China Futures Association, a financial regulation group
- Consumer Federation of America
- Consumers' Federation of Australia
- Campus Freethought Alliance, formerly the Center for Inquiry On Campus, a skeptics' group
- CFA Institute, an organization for finance professionals
- Code for America, a nonprofit civic technology organization
- Country Fire Authority, in Victoria, Australia

=== Sports ===
- Championnat de France Amateur, a French football competition
- Championnat de France Amateur (1935–1971), a French former football competition
- Chinese Football Association
- College Football Association, a defunct group which negotiated American football TV contracts
- County football association, governing bodies for local football in England
- Cyprus Football Association
- City Football Academy, part of Etihad Campus and the training base for Manchester footballers in England

== Science and technology ==
- Color filter array, part of an image sensor
- CompactFlash Association, a mass storage device trade group
- Confirmatory factor analysis, a statistical method
- Continuous flight augering, a drilling method
- Continuous flow analysis, a technique used in some automated analyzers
- Control-flow analysis, in computer science
- Crossed field antenna, a type of antenna for long and medium wave broadcasting
- Crossed-field amplifier, a specialized vacuum tube used as a microwave amplifier
- Current-feedback operational amplifier
- Component failure analysis
- The Harvard–Smithsonian Center for Astrophysics
- .cfa, the file extension for Adobe Premiere Pro computer audio files
- Cfa, one of two symbols for the humid subtropical climate, under the Köppen climate classification

== Transport ==
- Compagnie Française d'Aviation, a defunct French aircraft manufacturer
- National Company for Rail Transport or Chemins de fer Algériens, the former national railway of Algeria
- Chemins de Fer Armoricains, a former railway in Brittany, France
- ICAO airline code for China Flying Dragon Aviation

== Arts and entertainment ==
- Canadian Film Awards
- United States Commission of Fine Arts

== Other uses ==
- CFA franc, either of two currencies used in two separate groups of African countries
- Chartered Financial Analyst, an investment professional designation
- Chick-fil-A, an American fast food chain
- Call for abstracts, an invitation to submit presentation proposals to an academic conference
- Cape Field Artillery, a regiment of the South African Army
- Hong Kong Court of Final Appeal, or HKCFA, or CFA, the final appellate court of Hong Kong
