= Hendon Dock Junction Bridge =

Coordinates: 54.9040936°N 1.3596072°W

Hendon Dock Junction Bridge was a bridge within Sunderland Docks, England. It was unique for being made of aluminium, rather than the more usual steel.

The bridge was a double bascule bridge. It could open to allow shipping to pass through.

== Sunderland Docks ==
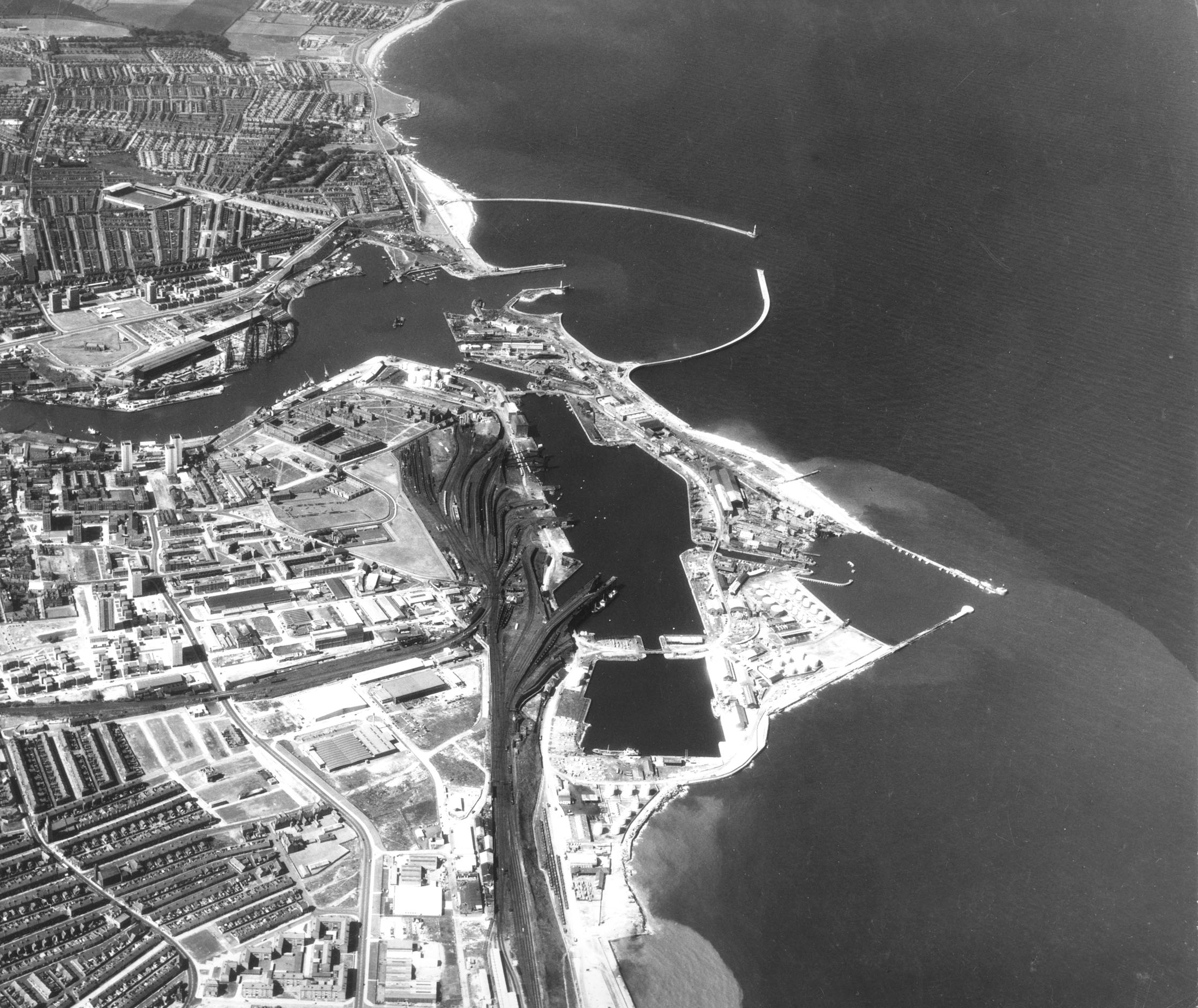
Sunderland and the River Wear, in 1969. North is at the top of the photograph, Hudson and Hendon Docks are towards the South.

Sunderland South Docks were built on the south bank, near the mouth of the River Wear. From 1850, the basin of Hudson Dock was built, extended southwards as Hudson Dock South from 1853, then Hendon Dock beyond, built from 1864. The main access to these docks was from their opening to the River Wear at the northern end of Hudson. The entrance was through a half-tide basin and a set of dock gates, crossed by the Gladstone Bridge. This was a small wrought-iron Howe truss swing bridge, built by Hawks, Crawshay and Sons of Gateshead, and is still in use.

Hendon Dock was connected to the south of Hudson Dock South by a small channel with a pair of opposed dock gates, which could hold back a difference of water level in either direction. This was crossed by a single-span swing bridge, of around 100 feet. This was hydraulically powered and had been built by William Armstrong of Newcastle.

=== Dock expansion ===
After WWII, the dock opening was to be widened from 60 to 90 ft, and so a new bridge was needed. The roadway across was also widened. The original bridge had been a steel plate girder swing bridge, swinging open in a quarter circle from a vertical axis on the East, seaward side of the dock. As the new channel was wider, a two-section bridge would now be easier than such a wide single opening span.

== Choice of aluminium ==
Aluminium had expanded enormously in its use during WWII for the production of aircraft. There were now several large producers of the raw metal within the UK, and rolling plants to produce it in rolled or extruded engineering sections. In 1948 there was also still severe rationing of steel, and this was only easily available for export goods. In contrast, there was an ample supply of aluminium, largely recycled from surplus aircraft. (Note: Similar constraints led to the Rover car using Birmabright aluminium alloy for bodywork panels, and the design of the Land Rover.)

Aluminium was seen as 'the metal of the future' and its light weight was also expected to show engineering advantages. For a moving bridge such as a bascule, the lighter weight of the spans would reduce the power needed for the lifting motors and the time take to open a bridge. Several companies intended to either capitalise on their wartime experience, or to move into this new field.

== Construction ==
The bridge was built by the Stockton on Tees engineering firm of Head, Wrightson & Co. The on-site resident engineer was J A Thrall. The design and construction of the bridge structure were carried out by Head Wrightson Light Alloy Structures Ltd., a new subsidiary which had been set up to specialise in an anticipated market for lightweight structures like this in aluminium. The metal itself, as extrusions and as rolled plate, was supplied by British Aluminium and Northern Aluminium (later Alcan) of Banbury.

Work began in December 1947 with the removal of the original bridge and the beginnings of earthworks for the new bridge foundations. Previously, the East abutment of the bridge had housed the pivot mechanism for the swing bridge, and sheet piling was used as a temporary coffer dam on both sides whilst the bridge pits and foundations were constructed.

The bridge spans were built in two sections. The quadrants were assembled first and placed onto their trunnions. Then the spans were brought in by boat, craned into position and riveted to them. Unusually for an aluminium structure, all joints were assembled with rivets, of a style and size more commonly seen in pre-war steelwork construction. Quadrants were installed in September, and the spans were attached at the start of October.

The East span was first raised on 14 October, then the West span was installed. By the end of November, the bridge was assembled and operational, at least for testing. The bridge was lifted by four 25 bhp electric motors, one for each quadrant. The low power needed was a direct result of using aluminium, and its low weight. A relatively small amount of kentledge was needed to balance the spans, compared to a steel bridge.

Weighted load tests, for both road and rail traffic, were carried out in January 1949. A road trailer with 75 ton load was used for one test, and rail tests with both 65 tons of iron scrap and a 41 ton locomotive, and a full train of loaded coal wagons were used.

== Opening ==
The bridge was officially opened on 26 November 1948, by the Minister of Transport, Alfred Barnes, MP. The 'ribbon' for the ribbon-cutting ceremony was made of aluminium foil.

=== Painting ===
The new bridge was painted in a watercolour by the artist Leslie Carr (1891–1961) and the painting was kept by Head Wrightson. On his retirement, Derek Kerr the bridge's construction manager, was presented with the painting. In 2015 he donated it to Sunderland Museum.

In 1951, a cutaway illustration of the bridge was printed in the Eagle comic.

== Decline ==
The bridge suffered from corrosion, particularly galvanic corrosion where steel components were attached to the aluminium structure. Its use was gradually less important too, with the decrease in railway coal traffic across the bridge to the loading staithes. For some time it was no longer used for rail traffic, but still for pedestrians and limited road traffic. The bridge closed entirely and was scrapped in 1977.
