= Olivier pile =

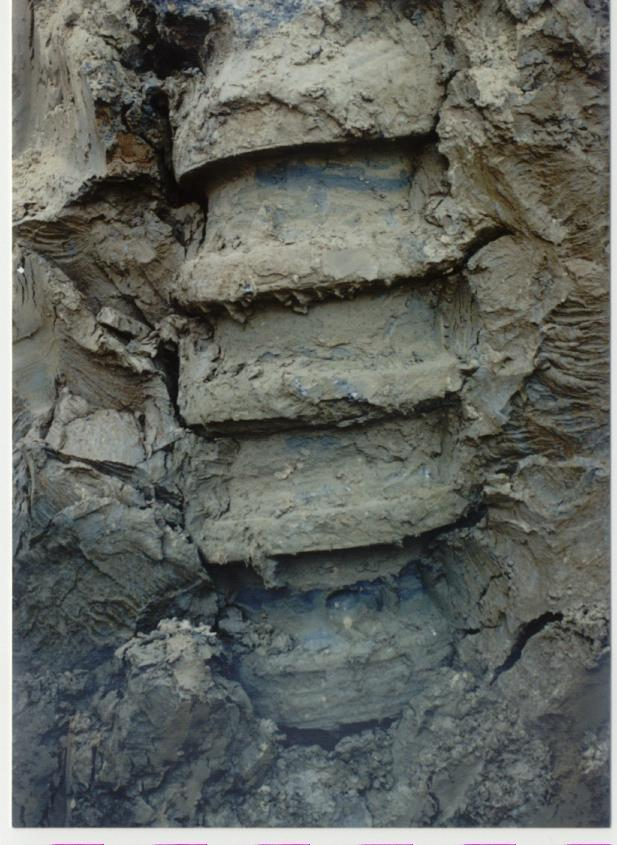
The screw-shaped shaft of an excavated Olivier Pile

An Olivier pile is a drilled displacement pile:. This is an underground deep foundation pile made of concrete or reinforced concrete with a screw-shaped shaft (helical shaft) which is performed without soil removal.

== History ==
The Belgian Gerdi Vankeirsbilck applied for the production patent for the Olivier pile in April 1996. This technique was implemented by his own company and various licences have been granted in Belgium and abroad. Due to its screw-shaped shaft, the Olivier pile is particularly suitable for use in soils with low load-bearing capacities, such as clay and loam. In 2018 a patent was applied for drilling without the use of a lost bit.

== Description ==
An Olivier pile is drilled into the ground by the use of drilling rig with a top-type rotary drive with variable rate of penetration. A lost tip is attached to a partial-flight auger which, in turn, is attached to a casing. The casing, which is rotated clockwise continuously, penetrates into the ground by the action of a torque and a vertical force. At the desired installation depth, the lost tip is released, and the reinforcing cage is inserted into the casing. Concrete is then placed inside the casing through a funnel. The casing and the partialflight auger are extracted by counter-clockwise rotation. The shaft of the Olivier pile has the shape of a screw.

The casing has an external diameter of 324mm (12.75"), with a wall thickness of 25mm (1"). The casing consists of several parts assembled with watertight couplings, which are strong enough to handle the maximum torque produced by the rotary drive. The various auger heads, for the various diameters of the Olivier pile, all have a larger diameter than the casing.

Common diameters of the auger head

- diameter 36–56 cm (14"-22")
- diameter 41–61 cm (16"-24")
- diameter 46–66 cm (18"- 26")
- diameter 51–71 cm (20"-28")
- diameter 56–76 cm (22"-30")

== Installation ==
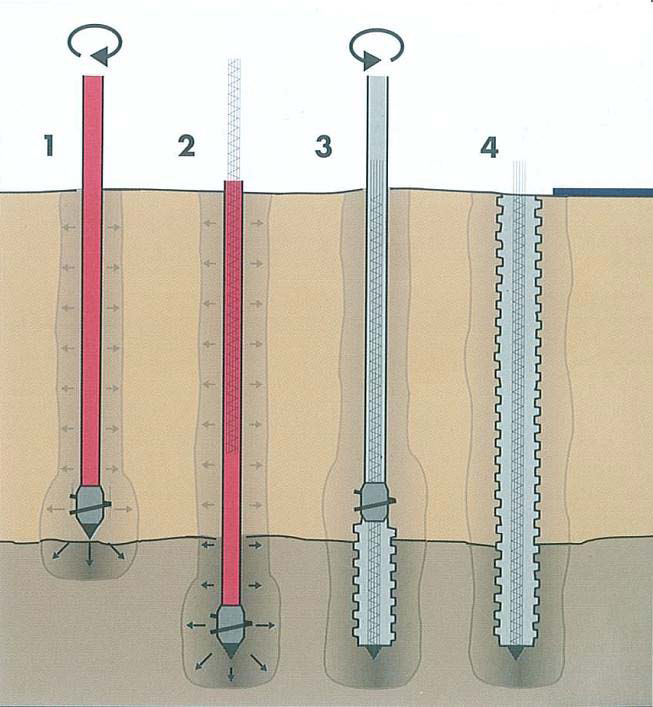
Implementation method of the Olivier Pile.: 1. clockwise drilling.; 2. required depth reached.; 3. reverse drilling and at the same time fill the space with concrete (and reinforcement).; 4. the formed pile.

- An Olivier Pile is screwed into the ground without vibration, the soil is displaced sideways. No soil is transported to the surface.
- The rotary pressure is compared with the results of the cone penetration test.
- The rotary head with a maximum torque of 55 ton meter is pulled up and down along an adjustable leader, which is strong enough to hold all the forces. The leader is adjustable in all directions, so that it is possible to drill leaning backward or forward.
- When the desired depth has been reached, it is possible to place reinforcement through the casing.
- Then the auger head is screwed back. The lost tip is disconnected from the auger head and left behind. During the screwback process, the soil is displaced again. This system is called 'double soil displacement'.
- While screwing back, concrete is poured into the casing. Because of the weight of the concrete, the concrete is injected into the space under the auger head. During the screwing back, the Olivier Pile is formed with the screw-shaped shaft. The screw-shape has a pitch of ±250mm (±10") and an external diameter of ±200mm (±8") larger than the base shaft. This process continues until the entire casing and the auger head are back on the ground.

== See also ==
- Franki pile
- Deep foundation
