= Underpinning =

Process of strengthening the foundation of an existing structure

In construction or renovation, underpinning is the process of strengthening the foundation of an existing building or other structure. Underpinning may be necessary for a variety of reasons:

- The original foundation is not strong or stable enough.
- The usage of the structure has changed.
- The properties of the soil supporting the foundation may have changed (possibly through subsidence) or were mischaracterized during design.
- The construction of nearby structures necessitates the excavation of soil supporting existing foundations.
- To increase the depth or load capacity of existing foundations to support the addition of another storey to the building (above or below grade).
- It is more economical, due to land price or otherwise, to work on the present structure's foundation than to build a new one.
- Earthquake, flood, drought or other natural causes have caused the structure to move, requiring stabilisation of foundation soils and/or footings.

Underpinning may be accomplished by extending the foundation in depth or breadth so it either rests on a more supportive soil stratum or distributes its load across a greater area. Use of micropiles and jet grouting are common methods in underpinning.

Underpinning may be necessary where P class (problem) soils in certain areas of the site are encountered.

Through semantic change the word underpinning has evolved to encompass all abstract concepts that serve as a foundation.

== Mass concrete underpinning ==
Mass concrete underpinning is one of the simplest forms of remedial underpinning at shallow depths. This type of underpinning is done by excavating "bays" along and under the existing foundation and filling them with mass concrete. It is sometimes called a "traditional" method to distinguish it from other types of underpinning like piling and needling. The latter often require underpinning specialists and may use proprietary underpinning systems. Mass concrete underpinning work is performed in compliance with the Party Wall Act (in the UK) using plans that are designed with engineering calculations to plan a sequence of excavating bays along and underneath the existing foundation without damaging existing walls. In some cases walls have collapsed because lateral support was inadequate leading to disputes among contractors, subcontractors and architects about where the responsibility lay for the mistake.

Mass concrete underpinning is commonly used when permanent support is needed to comply with the Party Wall Act of 1996 in the construction of a new basement during a restoration, rehabilitation or redevelopment.

In the United Kingdom most subsidence claims are for buildings at least 40 years old with shallow strip foundations. This is one of the most common types of foundations suffering from subsidence-related damage and according to the Building Research Establishment subsidence database, mass concrete underpinning was the most common underpinning and was often applied only to part of a building. If the soils have a low bearing capacity partial underpinning may increase the risk of differential settlement and localized settlement due to additional load on the soil.

== Beam and base underpinning ==
The beam and base method of underpinning is a more technically advanced adaptation of traditional mass concrete underpinning. A reinforced concrete beam is constructed below, above or in replacement of the existing footing. The beam then transfers the load of the building to mass concrete bases, which are constructed at designed strategic locations. Base sizes and depths are dependent upon the prevailing ground conditions. Beam design is dependent upon the configuration of the building and the applied loads. Anti-heave precautions are often incorporated in schemes where potential expansion of clay soils may occur.

== Mini-piled underpinning ==
Mini-piles have the greatest use where ground conditions are variable, where access is restrictive, where environmental pollution aspects are significant, and where structural movements in service must be minimal. Mini-piled underpinning is generally used when the loads from the foundations need to be transferred to stable soils at considerable depths – usually in excess of 5 m (16 ft). Mini-piles may either be augured or driven steel cased, and are normally between 150 mm (5.9 in) and 300 mm (12 in) in diameter. Structural engineers will use rigs which are specifically designed to operate in environments with restricted headroom and limited space, and can gain access through a regular domestic doorway. They are capable of constructing piles to depths of up to 15 m (49 ft). The technique of minipiling was first applied in Italy in 1952, and has gone through many different names, reflecting worldwide acceptance and expiration of the original patents.
The relatively small diameter of mini-piles is distinctive of this type of underpinning and generally uses anchoring or tie backs into an existing structure or rock. Conventional drilling and grouting methods are used for this method of underpinning. These mini-piles have a high slenderness ratio, feature substantial steel reinforcing elements and can sustain axial loading in both senses. The working loads of mini-piles can sustain up to 1,000 kN (100 long tons-force; 110 short tons-force) loads.
In comparison to Mass Concrete Underpinning, the engineering aspect of mini-piles is somewhat more involved, including rudimentary engineering mechanics such as statics and strength of materials. These mini-piles must be designed to work in tension and compression, depending on the orientation and application of the design. In detail, attention with design must be paid analytically to settlement, bursting, buckling, cracking, and interface consideration, whereas, from a practical viewpoint, corrosion resistance, and compatibility with the existing ground and structure must be regarded.

== Mini-piled underpinning schemes ==
Mini-piled underpinning schemes include pile and beam, cantilever pile-caps and piled raft systems. Cantilevered pile-caps are usually used to avoid disturbing the inside of a building, and require the construction of tension and compression piles to each cap. These are normally linked by a beam. The pile and beam system usually involves constructing pairs of piles on either side of the wall and linking them with a pile cap to support the wall. The pile caps are usually linked by reinforced concrete beams to support the entire length of the wall. Piled raft underpinning systems are commonly used when an entire building needs to be underpinned. The internal floors are completely removed, a grid of piles is installed, and a reinforced concrete raft is then constructed over the complete floor level, picking up and fully supporting all external and internal walls.

== Chemical grout ==
One of the uses of the soil improvement technique of pressure grouting is foundation underpinning especially during excavations like subway constructions. This technique has been used in municipal development projects of significant scope in the United States. One of the largest chemical grouting projects was the extension of the Pittsburgh Light Rail Transit subway when the foundations of six large buildings needed to be protected from ground movement and related building settlement.

Pressure grouting can be low pressure or high pressure. "Jet grouting" is a general term used for high pressure grouting where the high pressure air, water and cementing grout are injected into the ground at high velocity. This can be doing with single tube systems to mix the grout with in situ soil to form a grouted "column" in the ground. Double tube systems and triple tube systems using air and water remove some of the soil to create larger grouted bulbs or columns.

Low pressure chemical injection grouting is used to underpin structures in sandy soils.

== Gallery ==
Sketch of a cast in situ RC cantilever needle beam on micro piers or piles. Access to inside not needed.

Sketch of a standard needle beam on micro piers or piles. Inside access needed.

Sketch of concrete pier underpinning with the possibility of raising foundations.

Sketch showing the traditional method of needling a wall to reduce the weight on the foundations during underpinning work.

Underpinning the foundations of a railway bridge using a timber box crib to support the bridge. A completed concrete pad underpinning can be seen at the bottom right.

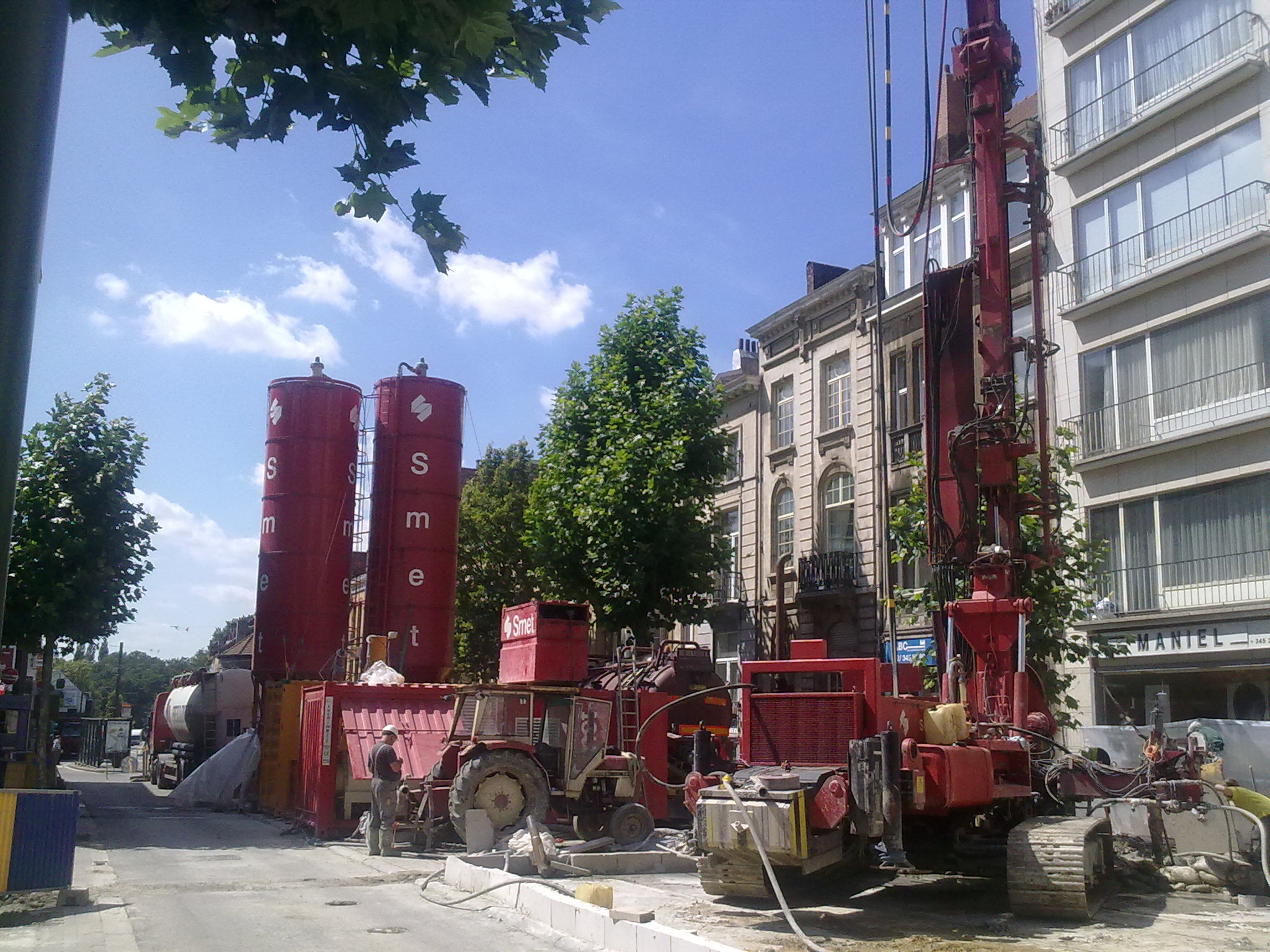
Drilling machines using jet grouting

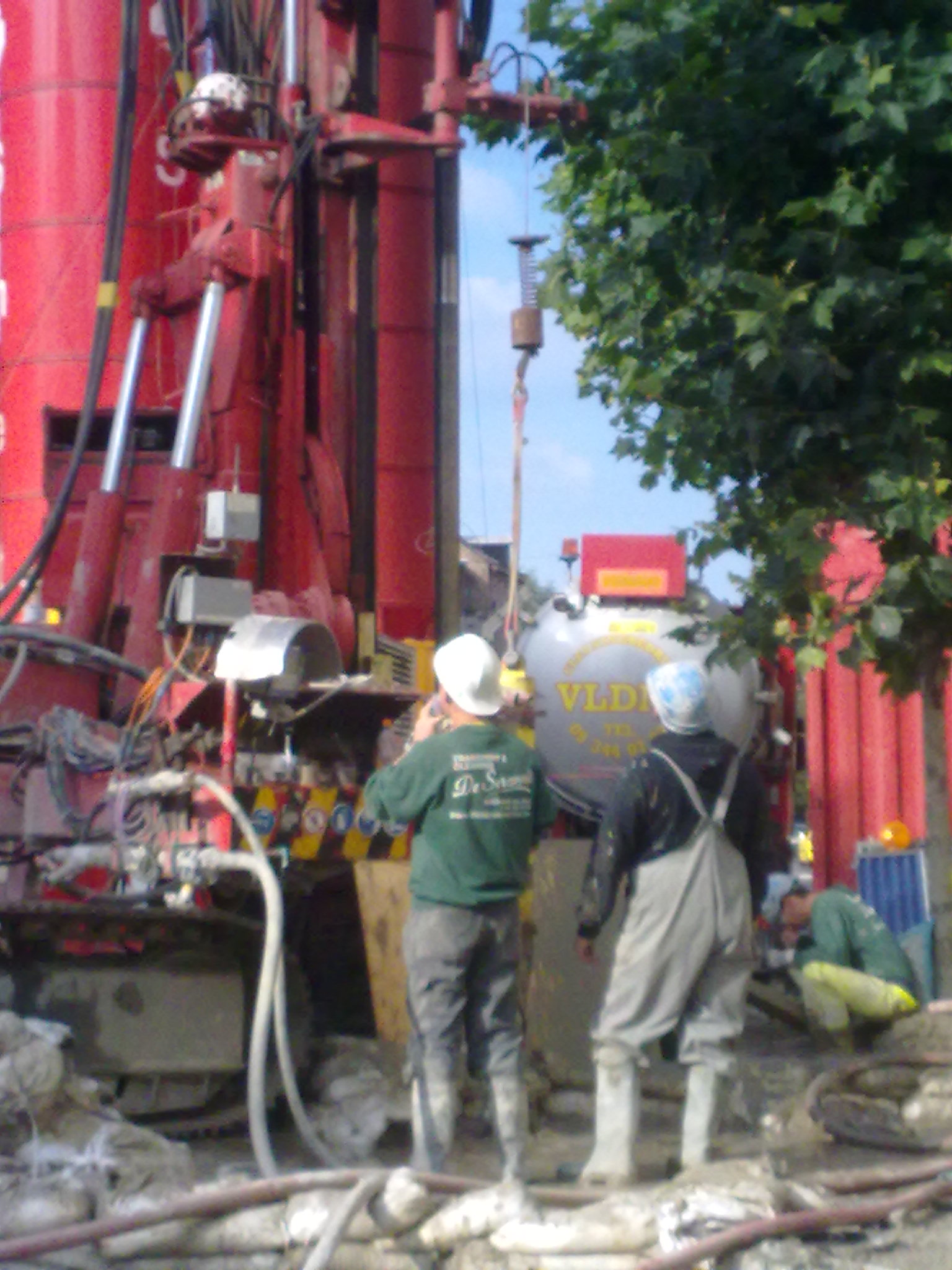
Close to the drilling head
