= Wall footing =

Type of shallow foundation

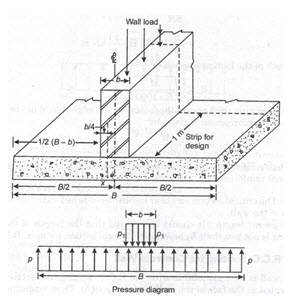
Wall Footing

A wall footing, or strip footing, is a continuous strip of concrete that serves to spread the weight of a load-bearing wall across an area of soil. It is a component of a shallow foundation.

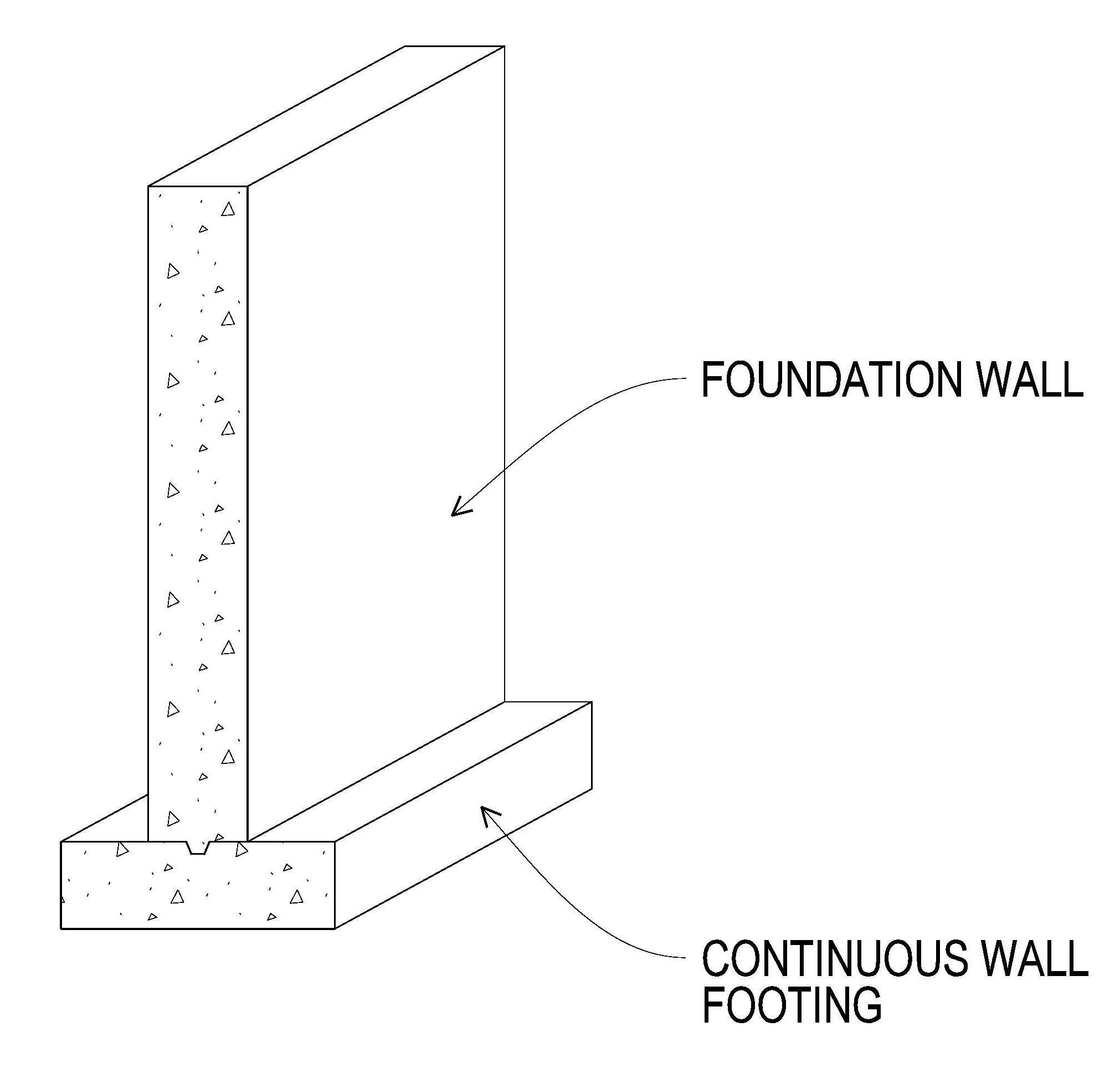
Wall Footing

Wall footings carrying direct vertical loads might be designed either in plain concrete or in reinforced concrete. Since a wall footing deflects essentially in one way, it is analyzed by considering as a strip of unit width and its length.
