= Dynamic compaction =

Method of increasing soil density

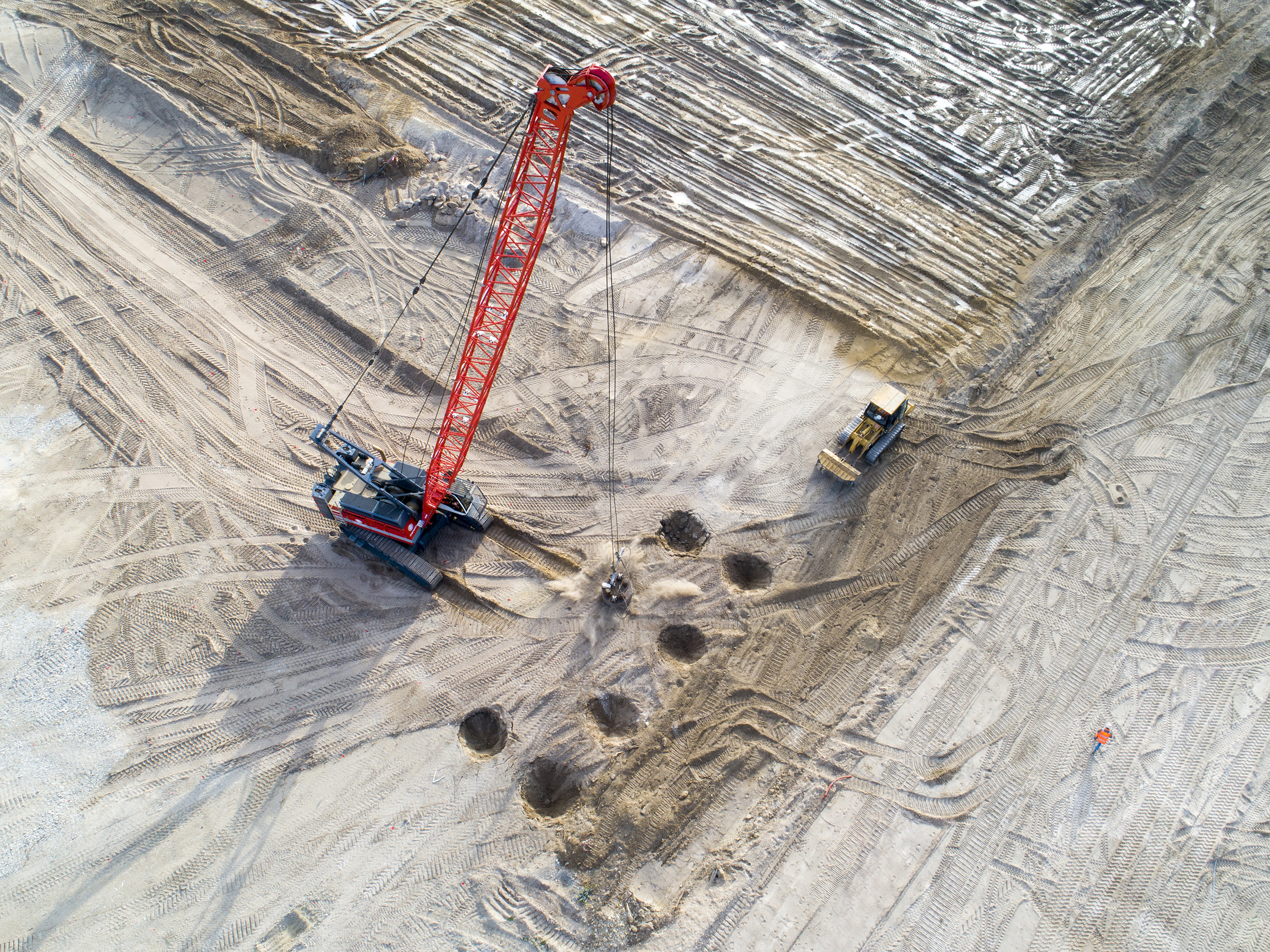

Dynamic compaction is a method that is used to increase the density of soils when certain subsurface constraints make other methods of soil compaction inappropriate. The process involves dropping a heavy weight repeatedly on the ground at regularly spaced points, usually laid out in a systematic fashion such as a grid. The weight and the height from which it is dropped determine the force delivered to the ground surface and thus the amount of compaction that occurs. Depending on the degree of compaction desired, the weight may vary between 8 and 36 tonnes (18,000 and 79,000 lb), and the height between 1 and 30 metres (3 and 98 ft).

The impact of the free fall creates stress waves that help in the densification of the soil. These stress waves can penetrate up to 10 metres (33 ft). In cohesionless soils, these waves create liquefaction that is followed by the compaction of the soil; in cohesive soils, they create an increased amount of pore water pressure that is followed by the compaction of the soil. Pore water pressure is the pressure of water that is trapped in the spaces between the solid particles of rocks and soils.

The degree of compaction depends on the weight of the hammer, the height from which the hammer is dropped, and the spacing of the locations at which the hammer is dropped. The initial weight dropping has the most impact, and penetrates up to a greater depth. The following drops, if spaced closer to one another, compact the shallower layers and the process is completed by compacting the soil at the surface.

Most soil types can be improved with dynamic compaction. Old fills and granular soils are most often treated. The soils that are below the water table have to be treated carefully to permit emission of the excess pore water pressure that is created when the weight is dropped onto the surface.
