= Crossed field antenna =

Type of antenna for long and mediumwave broadcasting

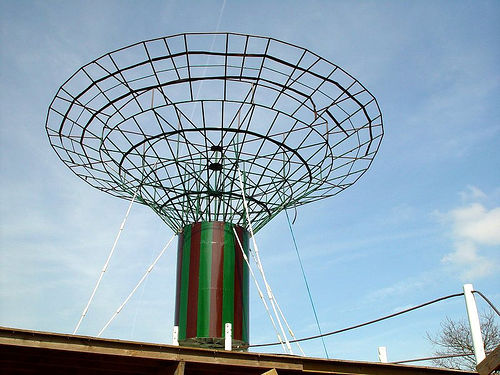
Crossed field test antenna installed in Silsden, U.K.

A crossed field antenna (CFA) is a type of radio antenna for long and mediumwave broadcasting, patented by F. M. Kabbary and M. C. Hately in 1986, which was claimed to have the same efficiency as a conventional antenna but only one-tenth the overall height. The invention was received with incredulity from experts in electromagnetics and antenna technology owing to a lack of theoretical justification and viable experimental verification. Although the antenna was installed in a few broadcasting stations in the 1990s, performance has not borne out the claims of the inventors.

== Description ==
As with other low frequency antennas, the crossed field antenna is installed above a ground plane which may be the Earth. It consists of three electrically active parts:

- A horizontal metal disc (or "D-plate") raised above and insulated from the ground plane;
- A vertical hollow metal cylinder (or "E-plate") of smaller diameter than the disc, which it is concentrically mounted above, and insulated from;
- A metal lattice funnel (or "extended conical section") radiating above and outward from and connected to the top of the cylinder.

The theory of the antenna's operation is described in its inventor's literature.

== Performance ==
In general, peer-reviewed journals have not accepted papers on CFAs, casting doubt on their claims. An independent report by Trainotti and Dorado published by the Institute of Electrical and Electronics Engineers (IEEE) suggested that the Crossed Field Antenna was no more efficient than a conventional antenna design of the same height. The data presented in figure 31 of the Trainotti and Dorado report shows measured field values up to 15 dB lower than (3% of) a theoretical 100% efficient monopole antenna.

The report also states that the presence of the D-plate always has a deleterious effect on the CFA's performance – meaning that removing the D-plate will improve the performance although the resulting antenna is not a CFA. Among its conclusions, it states that "The CFA performance is always a little wors[e] than the reference monopole in gain and bandwidth. ... Also, a simple monopole has a similar or better performance with an easier tuning system."

There are a handful of CFAs operating in Egypt, at powers ranging from 1 kW to 100 kW. These have been operational for over ten years and were developed by the engineering sector of the ERTU the Egyptian state broadcaster for their use. Many CFA projects in other countries failed including those in Australia, Brazil, China, Germany, Italy, the Isle of Man, and the UK.

The last commercial CFA was installed in 2003. At the General Assembly of the DRM Consortium, in Hangzhou China in April 2004, a Chinese manufacturer Zhongli made a demonstration with assistance from Thales SA and fed their new Crossed Field Antenna with 6 kW of DRM power. Results of the test are not available.
