= Shallow foundation =

Type of building foundation

Shallow foundation construction example

A shallow foundation is a type of building foundation that transfers structural load to the earth very near to the surface, rather than to a subsurface layer or a range of depths, as does a deep foundation. Customarily, a shallow foundation is considered as such when the width of the entire foundation is greater than its depth. In comparison to deep foundations, shallow foundations are less technical, thus making them more economical and the most widely used for relatively light structures.

== Types ==
Footings are always wider than the members that they support. Structural loads from a column or wall are usually greater than 1,000 kPa, while the soil's bearing capacity is commonly less than that (typically less than 400 kPa). By possessing a larger bearing area, the foundation distributes the pressure to the soil, decreasing the bearing pressure to within allowable values. A structure is not limited to one footing. Multiple types of footings may be used in a construction project.

=== Wall footing ===
A wall footing (or strip footing) is a continuous concrete strip that supports structural and non-structural load-bearing walls. Found directly under a wall, a wall footing's width is commonly 2–3 times wider than the wall above it.

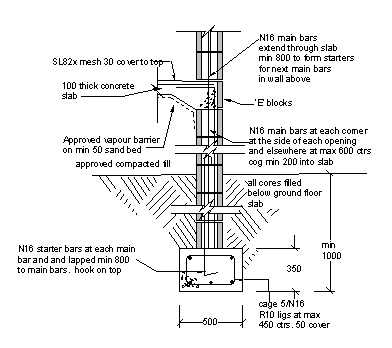
Detail section of a strip footing and its wall.

=== Isolated footing ===
Also called single-column footing, an isolated footing is a square, rectangular, or circular slab that supports the structural members individually. Generally, each column is set on an individual footing to transmit and distribute the load of the structure to the soil underneath. Sometimes, an isolated footing can be sloped or stepped at the base to spread greater loads. This type of footing is used when the structural load is relatively low, columns are widely spaced, and the soil's bearing capacity is adequate at a shallow depth.

=== Combined footing ===
When more than one column shares the same footing, it is called a combined footing. A combined footing is typically utilized when the spacing of the columns is too restricted such that if isolated footings were used, they would overlap one another. Also, when property lines make isolated footings eccentrically loaded, combined footings are preferred.

When the load among the columns is equal, the combined footing may be rectangular. Conversely, when the load among the columns is unequal, the combined footing should be trapezoidal.

=== Strap footing ===
A strap footing connects individual columns with the use of a strap beam. The general purpose of a strap footing is alike to those of a combined footing, where the spacing is possibly limited and/or the columns are adjacent to the property lines.

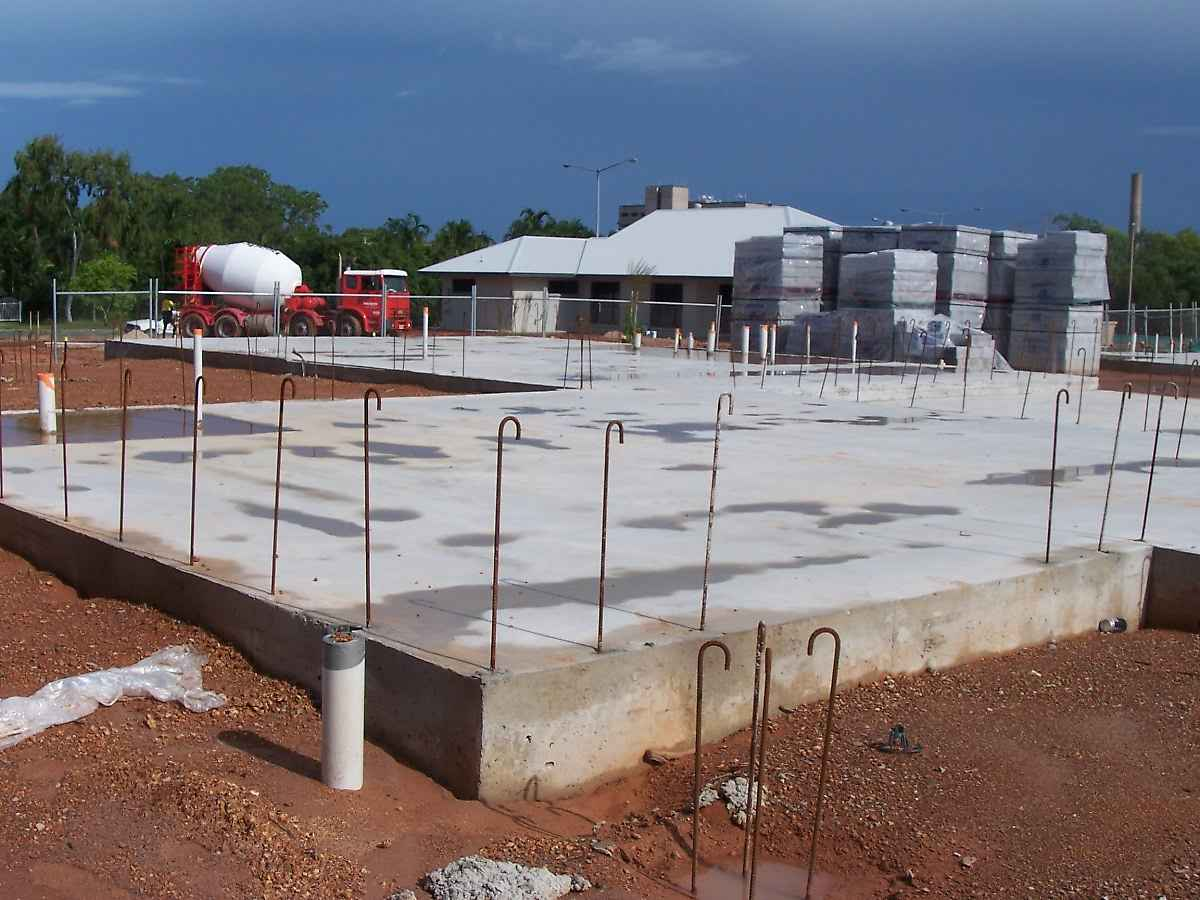
Mat foundation with its concrete undergoing curing.

=== Mat foundation ===
Also called raft foundation, a mat foundation is a single continuous slab that covers the entirety of the base of a building. Mat foundations support all the loads of the structure and transmit them to the ground evenly. Soil conditions may prevent other footings from being used. Since this type of foundation distributes the load coming from the building uniformly over a considerably large area, it is favored when individual footings are unfeasible due to the low bearing capacity of the soil.

Diagrams of the types of shallow foundations.

== Slab-on-grade foundation ==
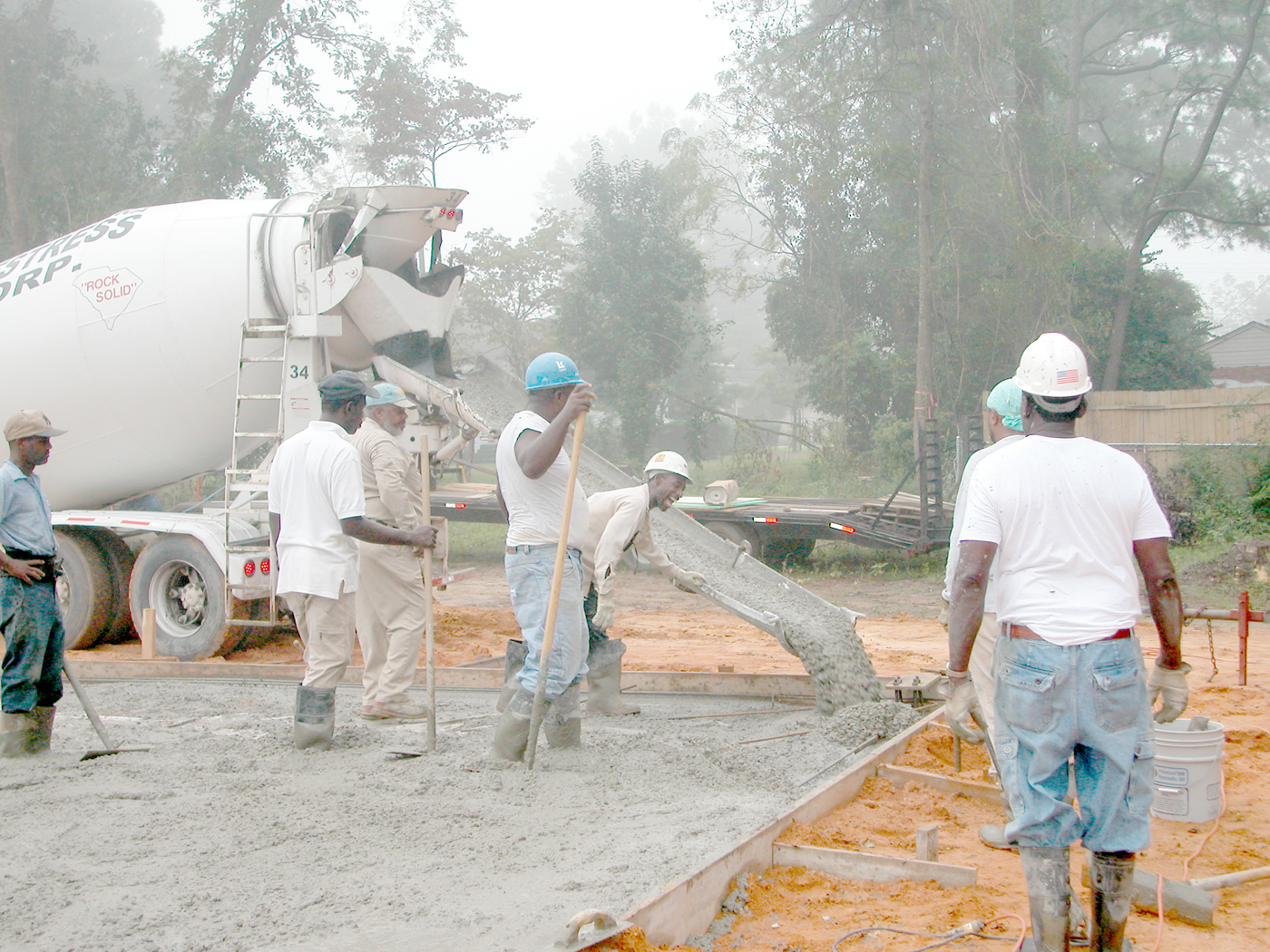
Pouring a slab-on-grade foundation

Slab-on-grade or floating slab foundations are a structural engineering practice whereby the reinforced concrete slab that is to serve as the foundation for the structure is formed from formwork set into the ground. The concrete is then poured into the formwork, leaving no space between the ground and the structure. This type of construction is most often seen in warmer climates, where ground freezing and thawing is less of a concern and where there is no need for heat ducting underneath the floor. Frost Protected Shallow Foundations (or FPSF) which are used in areas of potential frost heave, are a form of slab-on-grade foundation.

Remodeling or extending such a structure may be more difficult. Over the long term, ground settling (or subsidence) may be a problem, as a slab foundation cannot be readily jacked up to compensate; proper soil compaction prior to pour can minimize this. The slab can be decoupled from ground temperatures by insulation, with the concrete poured directly over insulation (for example, extruded polystyrene foam panels), or heating provisions (such as hydronic heating) can be built into the slab.

Slab-on-grade foundations should not be used in areas with expansive clay soil. While elevated structural slabs actually perform better on expansive clays, it is generally accepted by the engineering community that slab-on-grade foundations offer the greatest cost-to-performance ratio for tract homes. Elevated structural slabs are generally only found on custom homes or homes with basements.

Roads may be regarded as a type of shallow foundation, as they transfer loads from traffic to the underlying ground at relatively shallow depths. Understanding the interaction between the pavement structure and subgrade soil is therefore essential for ensuring long-term performance and stability. Modern foundation engineering increasingly incorporates field-based and analytical approaches to better capture soil behaviour under realistic loading conditions. The use of portable in-situ testing devices, such as the lightweight deflectometer (LWD), has enabled improved estimation of soil stiffness and deformation characteristics directly in the field. These measurements can be integrated into design frameworks to enhance the accuracy of foundation performance predictions.

Copper piping, commonly used to carry natural gas and water, reacts with concrete over a long period, slowly degrading until the pipe fails. This can lead to what is commonly referred to as slab leaks. These occur when pipes begin to leak from within the slab. Signs of a slab leak range from unexplained dampened carpet spots, to drops in water pressure and wet discoloration on exterior foundation walls. Copper pipes must be lagged (that is, insulated) or run through a conduit or plumbed into the building above the slab. Electrical conduits through the slab must be water-tight, as they extend below ground level and can potentially expose wiring to groundwater.

== Vertical bearing capacity ==
The ultimate bearing capacity of a shallow foundation depends on whether a total stress or effective stress analysis is considered. Generally, a total stress analysis is applicable for low permeability soils (clay) over the short-term. For high permeability soils (sand) or for low permeability soils over the long-term, an effective stress analysis is more appropriate.

=== Short-term total stress analysis ===
For a total stress analysis, the ultimate bearing capacity of a shallow foundation is given by the following equation:

$\sigma_f = s_c d_c N_c s_u + \gamma h$

where

- $s_c$ is the shape factor which can be conservatively taken as 1
- $d_c$ is the depth factor which can be conservatively taken as 1
- $N_c$ is the bearing capacity factor, which is numerically equal to $2 + \pi \approx 5.14$
- $s_u$ is the undrained shear strength of the soil
- $\gamma$ is the unit weight of the soil adjacent to the footing
- $h$ is the height from the founding plane to the ground surface

=== Effective stress analysis ===
For an effective stress analysis, the ultimate bearing capacity of a shallow foundation is given by the following equation.

$\sigma'_f = s_q d_q N_q \sigma'_{v0} + s_\gamma d_\gamma N_\gamma \cdot (0.5 \gamma B - \Delta u)$

where

- $s_q$ and $s_\gamma$ are analogous shape factors which can be conservatively taken as 1
- $d_q$ and $d_\gamma$ are analogous depth factors which can be conservatively taken as 1
- $N_q$ is the bearing capacity factor (generally taken as $K_p e^{\pi tan( \phi' )}$
- $\sigma'_{v0}$ is the in situ vertical effective stress acting at the level of the foundation base
- $N_\gamma$ is analogous to the bearing capacity factor $N_q$
- $\gamma$ is the unit weight of the soil adjacent to the footing
- $B$ is the width of the footing
- $\Delta u$ is the increase in pore water pressure between the founding plane and a depth of B/2 below it.

== See also ==
- Argillipedoturbation
- Building construction
- Construction engineering
- Fiber reinforced concrete
- Grade beam
- Precast concrete
- Prestressed concrete
- Rebar
- Steel fixer
- Tie rod
