= Continuous flight augering =

Continuous flight augering (CFA), also known as auger cast piling, is a technique used in construction to create a concrete deep foundation.

== Description ==
A continuous flight auger drill is used to excavate a hole and concrete is injected through a hollow shaft under pressure as the auger is extracted. Reinforcement is then inserted after the auger is removed. This creates a continuous pile without ever leaving an open hole.

Continuous flight augering can be used to construct a secant piled wall which can be used as a retaining wall or as shoring during excavation. Once initial piles are set with concrete, other shafts are augered between them, slicing into the original piles, with the new ones receiving rebar. The finished result is a continuous wall of reinforced concrete that aids and protects workers during excavation.

== History ==
Continuous flight auger has been used in the United Kingdom since 1966.
