= Larssen sheet piling =

Type of retaining wall

Larssen sheet piling is a kind of sheet piling retaining wall. Segments with indented profiles (troughs) interlock to form a wall with alternating indents and outdents. The troughs increase resistance to bending. The segments are typically made of steel or another metal.

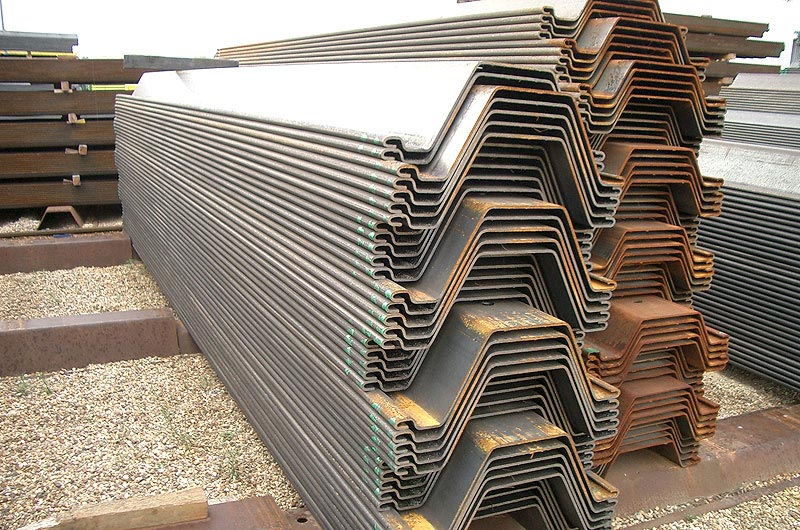

Larssen sheet piling was developed in 1906 by Tryggve Larssen, engineer from Bremen (Germany). Its applications include piers, oil terminals, waste storage facilities, shoreline protection, bridges, houses, buildings, dry docks, other construction sites, and for the strengthening of pond banks, preventing slumping into a pit, and flooding.

== Construction ==
Lengths can reach 36 meters.

Each segment is flipped 180° versus the preceding segment. The segments lock together using a variety of interconnections.

The fully assembled structure is formed in a linear, circular, or other shape.

To reduce the filtering space, mixed sealant is injected. Additionally, it may be combined with the use of dowels, metal beams and pipes.

Metal dowels are hot-rolled steel and cold-rolled.

== Design ==
Cross-section of Larssen sheet piling

- Tongue Larssen - Tongue Larssens are up to 34 meters long and 80 centimeters wide. They have locks, which allow people to connect one profile to another vertically to create a sealed metal diaphragm wall. Transverse profiles can be in the shape of letters: S, Z, L or Ω (Omega) where the trough can be of varying depth.
- Special Profile - Special profiles are long and narrow without locks. They usually have a wavy or trough shape to increase the resistance to bending.
- Cantilever - Bending moments and shears are calculated under the assumption that the wall is a cantilever beam fixed at the bottom of the wall.
- Anchored Wall Design- Bending moments, shears, and anchor force are calculated under the assumption that the wall is a beam with simple supports at the anchor elevation and at the bottom of the wall (the place where the wall moves beneath the surface of the ground. With the bottom of the wall at the penetration consistent with a factor of safety of 1, the lateral reaction at the bottom support will be zero and the lateral reaction at the upper support will be the horizontal component of the anchor force.

== Applications ==
Larssens are used in foundation pits, coastline strengthening, bridge construction, piers, tide control, flood protection, agriculture irrigation, water reservoir and other work requiring extremely strong support in a narrow geometry.
