= Soil liquefaction =

Soil material that is ordinarily a solid behaving like a thick liquid

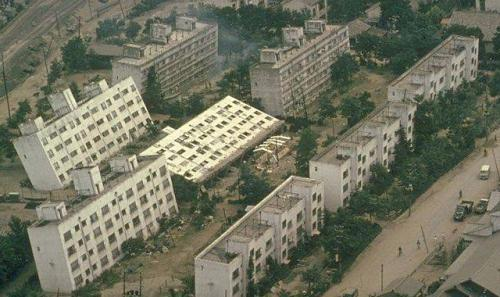
Some effects of soil liquefaction after the 1964 Niigata earthquake

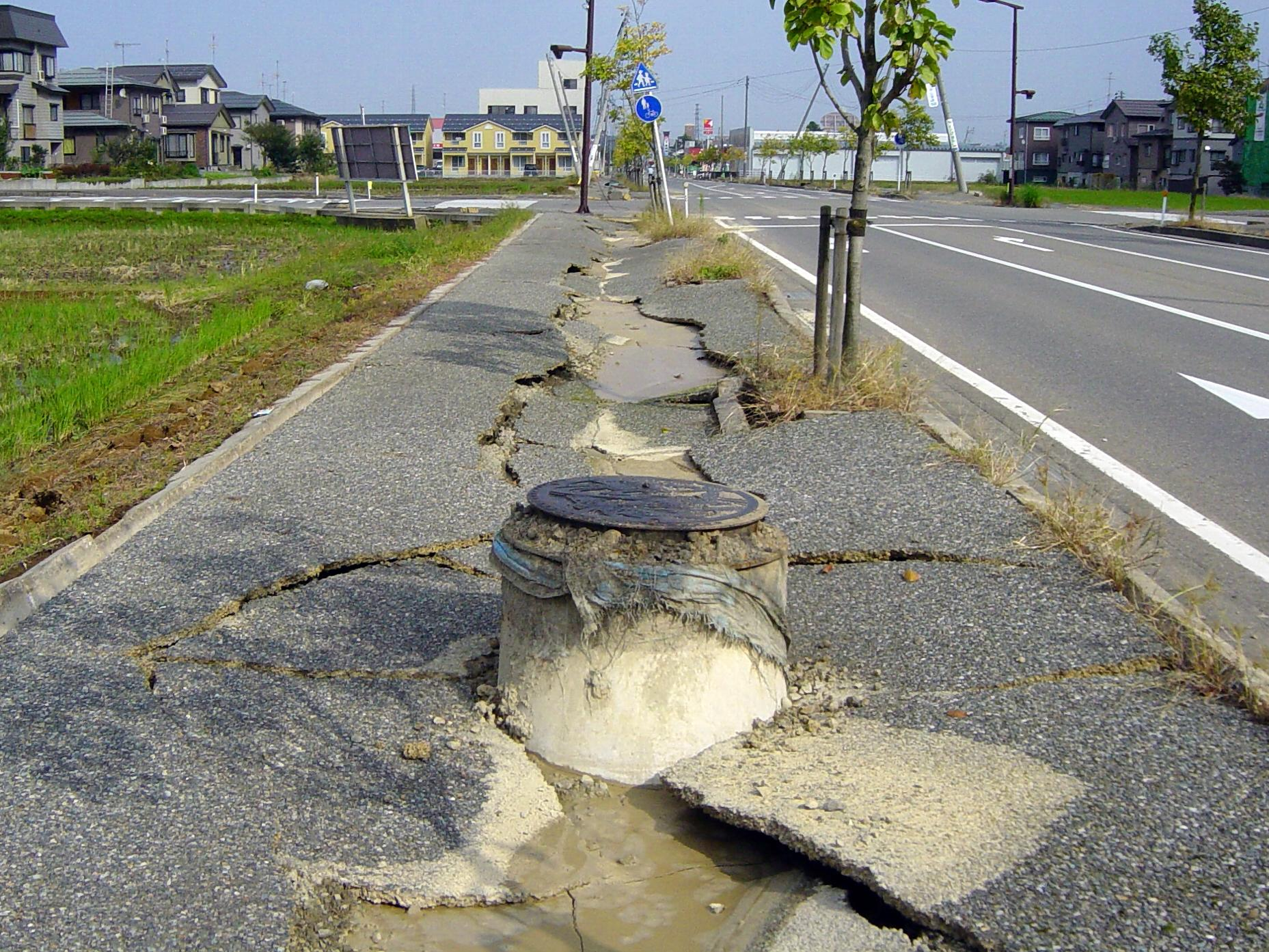
Soil liquefaction allowed this sewer manhole to float upward and breach the pavement during the 2004 Chūetsu earthquake.

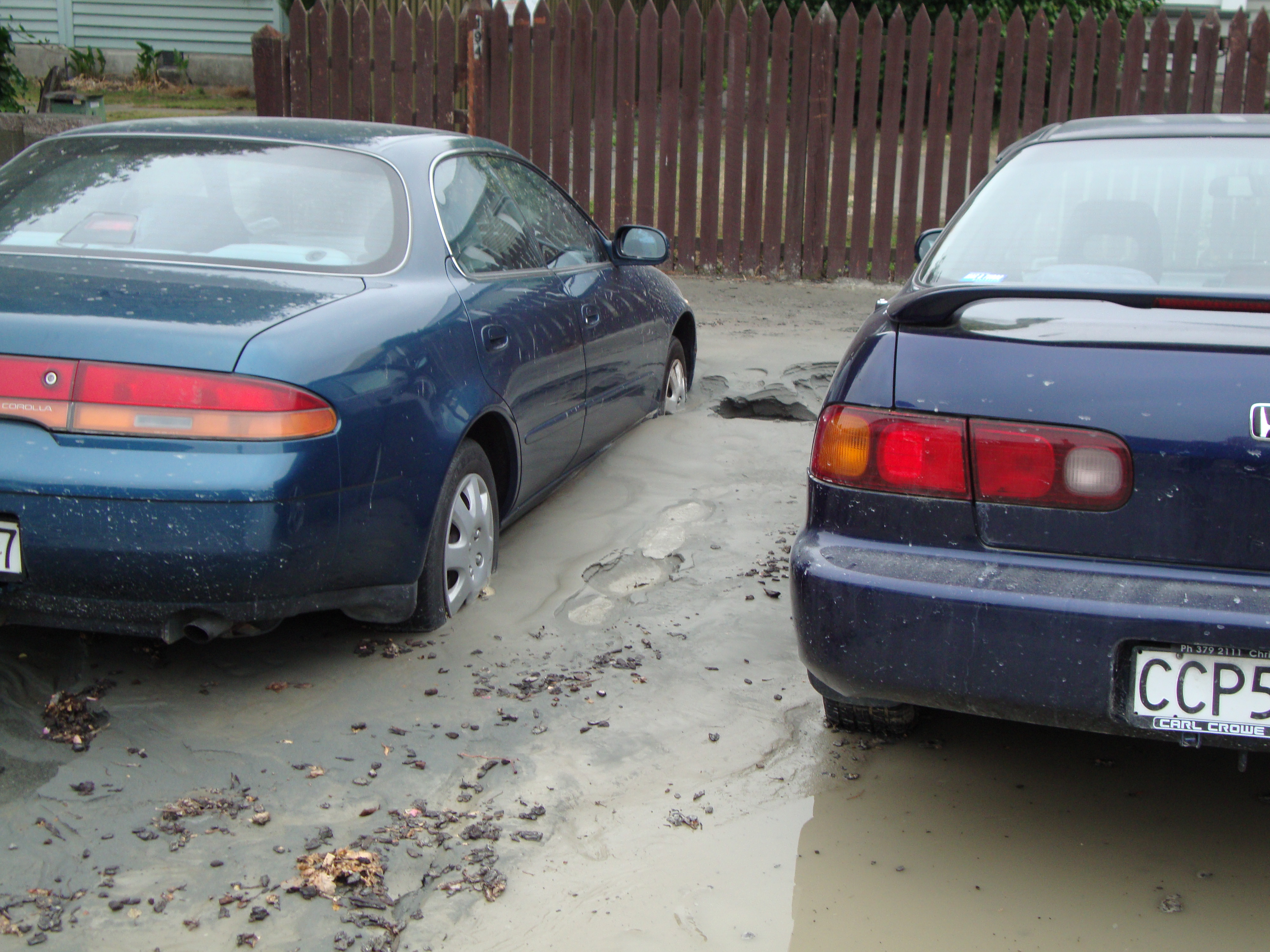
Soil liquefaction in Christchurch. The 2011 earthquake caused a layer of water and fine sand to collect on the surface of this street.

Soil liquefaction occurs when a cohesionless saturated or partially saturated soil substantially loses strength and stiffness in response to an applied stress such as shaking during an earthquake or other sudden change in stress condition, in which material that is ordinarily a solid behaves like a liquid, a sudden physical change termed thixotropy. In soil mechanics, the term "liquefied" was first used by Allen Hazen in reference to the 1918 failure of the Calaveras Dam in California. He described the mechanism of flow liquefaction of the embankment dam as:

If the pressure of the water in the pores is great enough to carry all the load, it will have the effect of holding the particles apart and of producing a condition that is practically equivalent to that of quicksand... the initial movement of some part of the material might result in accumulating pressure, first on one point, and then on another, successively, as the early points of concentration were liquefied.

The phenomenon is most often observed in saturated, loose (low density or uncompacted), sandy soils, under the name of quicksands or sinking sand. This is because a loose sand has a tendency to compress when a load is applied. Dense sands, by contrast, tend to expand in volume or 'dilate'. If the soil is saturated by water, a condition that often exists when the soil is below the water table or sea level, then water fills the gaps between soil grains ('pore spaces'). In response to soil compressing, the pore water pressure increases and the water attempts to flow out from the soil to zones of low pressure (usually upward towards the ground surface). However, if the loading is rapidly applied and large enough, or is repeated many times (e.g., earthquake shaking, storm wave loading) such that the water does not flow out before the next cycle of load is applied, the water pressures may build to the extent that it exceeds the force (contact stresses) between the grains of soil that keep them in contact. These contacts between grains are the means by which the weight from buildings and overlying soil layers is transferred from the ground surface to layers of soil or rock at greater depths. This loss of soil structure causes it to lose its strength (the ability to transfer shear stress), and it may be observed to flow like a liquid (hence 'liquefaction'). A phenomenon of resonance between an oscillatory stress and the natural frequency of a water-saturated soil may occur during earthquakes or other types of cyclic loading (e.g. heavy vertical oscillatory probes), stemming in sudden soil or subsoil liquefaction.

Although the effects of soil liquefaction have been long understood, engineers took more notice after the 1964 Alaska earthquake and 1964 Niigata earthquake. It was a major cause of the destruction produced in San Francisco's Marina District during the 1989 Loma Prieta earthquake, and in the Port of Kobe during the 1995 Great Hanshin earthquake. More recently soil liquefaction was largely responsible for extensive damage to residential properties in the eastern suburbs and satellite townships of Christchurch during the 2010 Canterbury earthquake and more extensively again following the Christchurch earthquakes that followed in early and mid-2011. On 28 September 2018, an earthquake of 7.5 magnitude hit the Central Sulawesi province of Indonesia. Resulting soil liquefaction buried the suburb of Balaroa and Petobo village 3 metres (9.8 ft) deep in mud during the 2018 Palu earthquake. The government of Indonesia is considering designating the two neighborhoods of Balaroa and Petobo, that have been totally buried under mud, as mass graves.

The building codes in many countries require engineers to consider the effects of soil liquefaction in the design of new buildings and infrastructure such as bridges, embankment dams and retaining structures.

== Technical definitions ==
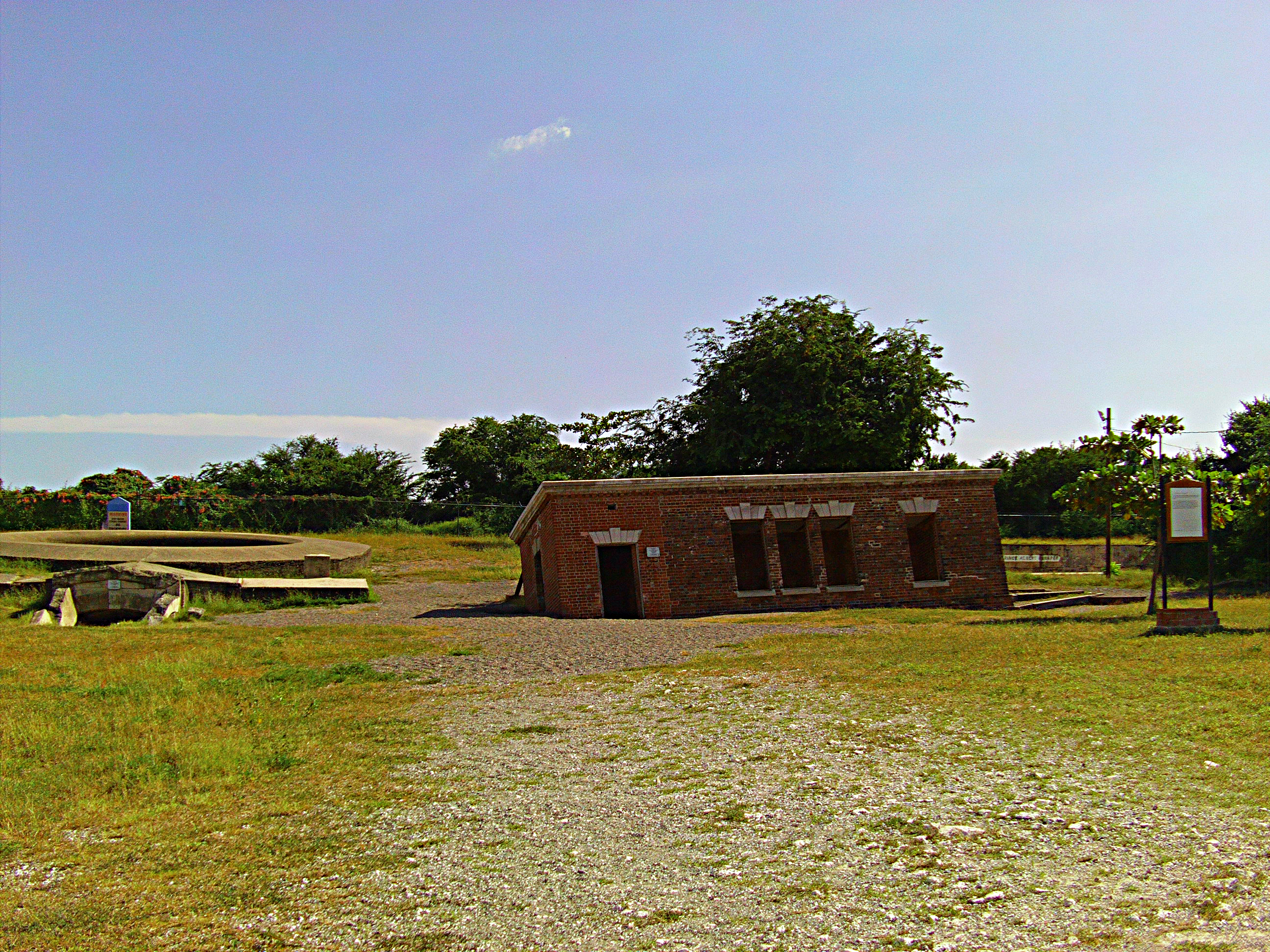
The Giddy House in Port Royal, Jamaica, which partially sank into the ground during an earthquake in 1907 which produced soil liquefaction, resulting in its distinctive tilted appearance

Soil liquefaction occurs when the effective stress (shear strength) of soil is reduced to essentially zero. This may be initiated by either monotonic loading (i.e., a single, sudden occurrence of a change in stress – examples include an increase in load on an embankment or sudden loss of toe support) or cyclic loading (i.e., repeated changes in stress condition – examples include wave loading or earthquake shaking). In both cases a soil in a saturated loose state, and one which may generate significant pore water pressure on a change in load are the most likely to liquefy. This is because loose soil has the tendency to compress when sheared, generating large excess porewater pressure as load is transferred from the soil skeleton (soil matrix) to adjacent pore water during undrained loading. As pore water pressure rises, a progressive loss of strength of the soil occurs as effective stress is reduced. Liquefaction is more likely to occur in sandy or non-plastic silty soils but may in rare cases occur in gravels and clays (see quick clay).

A 'flow failure' may start if the current strength of the soil falls below the strength required to maintain the equilibrium of a slope or footing of a structure. This can occur due to monotonic (single-event) loading or cyclic loading, and can be sudden and catastrophic. A historical example is the Aberfan disaster. Casagrande referred to this type of phenomena as 'flow liquefaction', although a state of zero effective stress is not required for this to occur. Flow failure is discussed in great detail in the 33rd Rankine Lecture by Kenji Ishihara

'Cyclic liquefaction' is the state of soil when large shear strains have accumulated in response to cyclic loading. A typical reference strain for the approximate occurrence of zero effective stress is 5% double amplitude shear strain. This is a soil test-based definition, usually performed via cyclic triaxial, cyclic direct simple shear, or cyclic torsional shear type apparatus. These tests are performed to determine a soil's resistance to liquefaction by observing the number of cycles of loading at a particular shear stress amplitude required to induce 'fails'. Failure here is defined by the aforementioned shear strain criteria.

The term 'cyclic mobility' refers to the mechanism of progressive reduction of effective stress due to cyclic loading. This may occur in all soil types including dense soils. However, on reaching a state of zero effective stress such soils immediately dilate and regain strength. Thus, shear strains are significantly less than a true state of soil liquefaction.

== Occurrence ==
Liquefaction is more likely to occur in loose to moderately saturated granular soils with poor drainage, such as silty sands or sands and gravels containing impermeable sediments. During wave loading, usually cyclic undrained loading, e.g. seismic loading, loose sands tend to decrease in volume, which produces an increase in their pore water pressures and consequently a decrease in shear strength, i.e. reduction in effective stress.

Deposits most susceptible to liquefaction are young (Holocene-age, deposited within the last 10,000 years) sands and silts of similar grain size (well-sorted), in beds at least metres thick, and saturated with water. Such deposits are often found along stream beds, beaches, dunes, and areas where windblown silt (loess) and sand have accumulated. Examples of soil liquefaction include quicksand, quick clay, turbidity currents and earthquake-induced liquefaction.

Depending on the initial void ratio, the soil material can respond to loading either strain-softening or strain-hardening. Strain-softened soils, e.g., loose sands, can be triggered to collapse, either monotonically or cyclically, if the static shear stress is greater than the ultimate or steady-state shear strength of the soil. In this case flow liquefaction occurs, where the soil deforms at a low constant residual shear stress. If the soil strain-hardens, e.g., moderately dense to dense sand, flow liquefaction will generally not occur. However, cyclic softening can occur due to cyclic undrained loading, e.g., earthquake loading. Deformation during cyclic loading depends on the density of the soil, the magnitude and duration of the cyclic loading, and amount of shear stress reversal. If stress reversal occurs, the effective shear stress could reach zero, allowing cyclic liquefaction to take place. If stress reversal does not occur, zero effective stress cannot occur, and cyclic mobility takes place.

The resistance of the cohesionless soil to liquefaction will depend on the density of the soil, confining stresses, soil structure (fabric, age and cementation), the magnitude and duration of the cyclic loading, and the extent to which shear stress reversal occurs.

== Liquefaction potential: simplified empirical analysis ==
Three parameters are needed to assess liquefaction potential using the simplified empirical method:

1. A measure of soil resistance to liquefaction: Standard Penetration Resistance (SPT), Cone Penetration Resistance (CPT), or shear-wave velocity (Vs)
2. The earthquake load, measured as cyclic stress ratio $CSR=\frac{\tau_{av}}{\sigma'_{v}}=0,65\frac{a_{max}}{g}\frac{\sigma_{v}}{\sigma'_{v}}r_d$
3. The capacity of the soil to resist liquefaction, expressed in terms of the cyclic resistance ratio (CRR)

== Liquefaction potential: advanced constitutive models ==
The interaction between the solid skeleton (soil matrix) and pore fluid (pore water) flow has been considered by many researchers to model the material softening associated with the liquefaction phenomenon. The dynamic performance of saturated porous media depends on the soil-pore fluid interaction. When the saturated porous media is subjected to strong ground shaking, pore fluid movement relative to the solid skeleton is induced. The transient movement of pore fluid can significantly affect the redistribution of pore water pressure, which is generally governed by the loading rate, soil permeability, pressure gradient, and boundary conditions. It is well known that for a sufficiently high seepage velocity, the governing flow law in porous media is nonlinear and does not follow Darcy's law. This fact is now considered in the studies of soil-pore fluid interaction for liquefaction modeling. A fully explicit dynamic finite element method has been developed for turbulent flow law. The governing equations have been expressed for saturated porous media based on the extension of the Biot formulation. The elastoplastic behavior of soil under earthquake loading has been simulated using a generalized plasticity theory that is composed of a yield surface along with a non-associated flow rule.

== Earthquake liquefaction ==
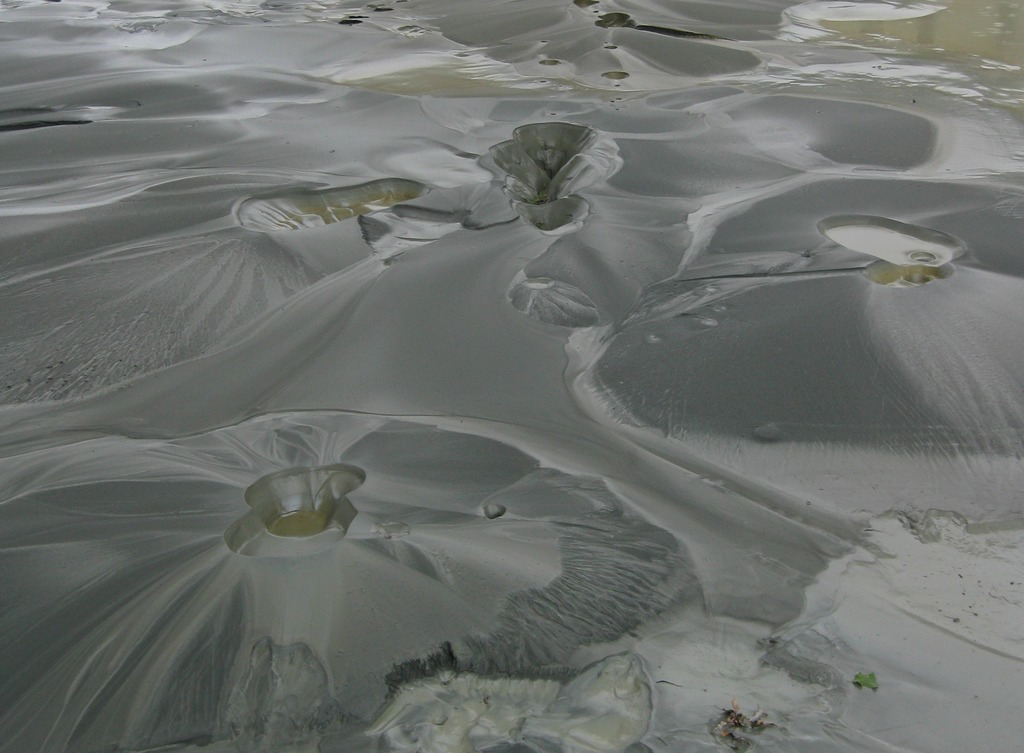
Sand boils that erupted during the 2011 Christchurch earthquake

Pressures generated during large earthquakes can force underground water and liquefied sand to the surface. This can be observed at the surface as effects known alternatively as "sand boils", "sand blows" or "sand volcanoes". Such earthquake ground deformations can be categorized as primary deformation if located on or close to the ruptured fault, or distributed deformation if located at considerable distance from the ruptured fault.

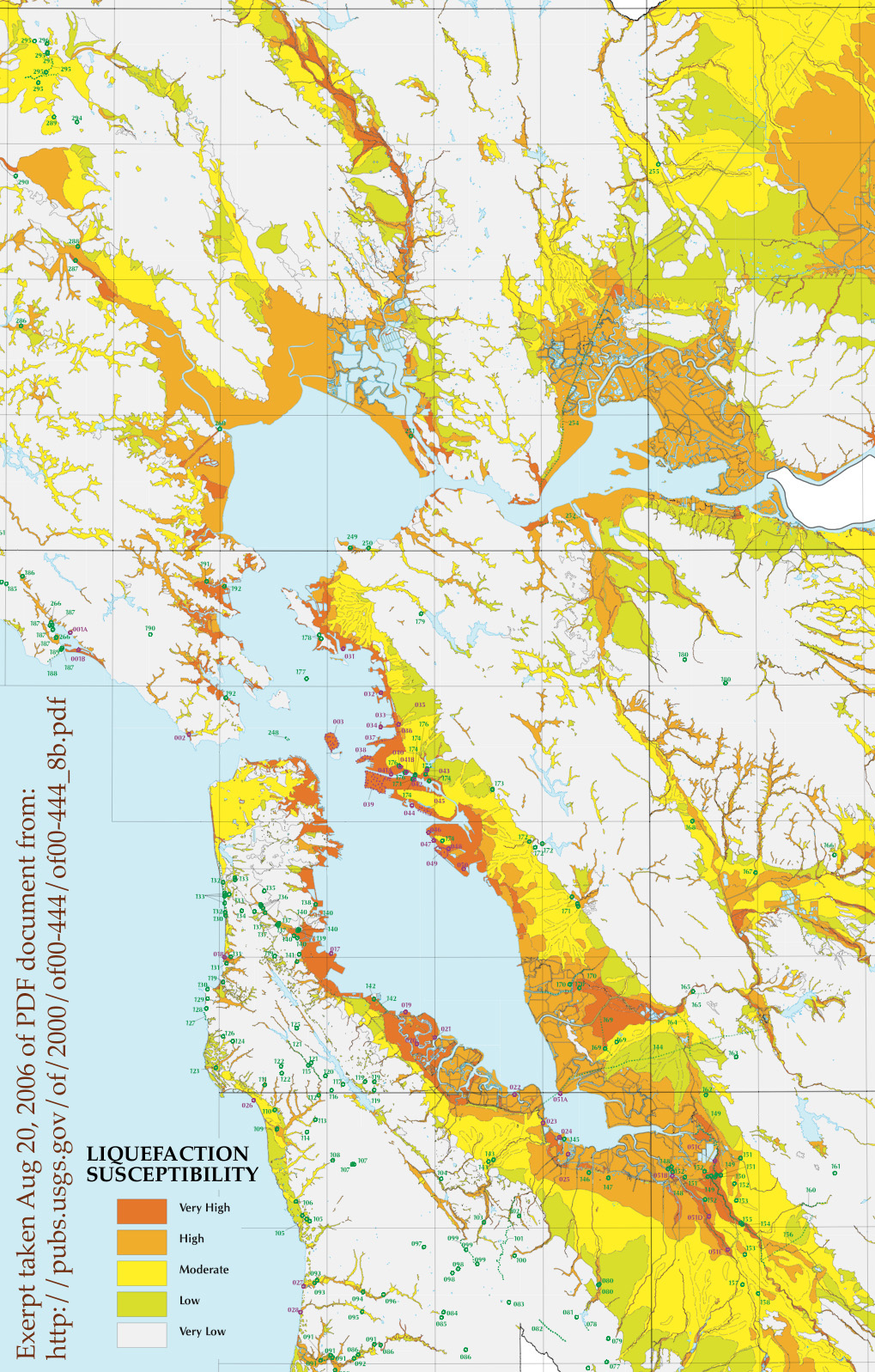
A liquefaction susceptibility map – excerpt of USGS map for the San Francisco Bay Area. Many areas of concern in this region are also densely urbanized.

The other common observation is land instability – cracking and movement of the ground down slope (landslides) or towards unsupported margins of rivers, streams, or the coast. The failure of ground in this manner is called 'lateral spreading' and may occur on very shallow slopes with angles only 1 or 2 degrees from the horizontal.

One positive aspect of soil liquefaction is the tendency for the effects of earthquake shaking to be significantly damped (reduced) for the remainder of the earthquake. This is because liquids do not support a shear stress and so once the soil liquefies due to shaking, subsequent earthquake shaking (transferred through ground by shear waves) is not transferred to buildings at the ground surface.

Studies of liquefaction features left by prehistoric earthquakes, called paleoliquefaction or paleoseismology, can reveal information about earthquakes that occurred before records were kept or accurate measurements could be taken.

Soil liquefaction induced by earthquake shaking is a major contributor to urban seismic risk.

== Effects ==
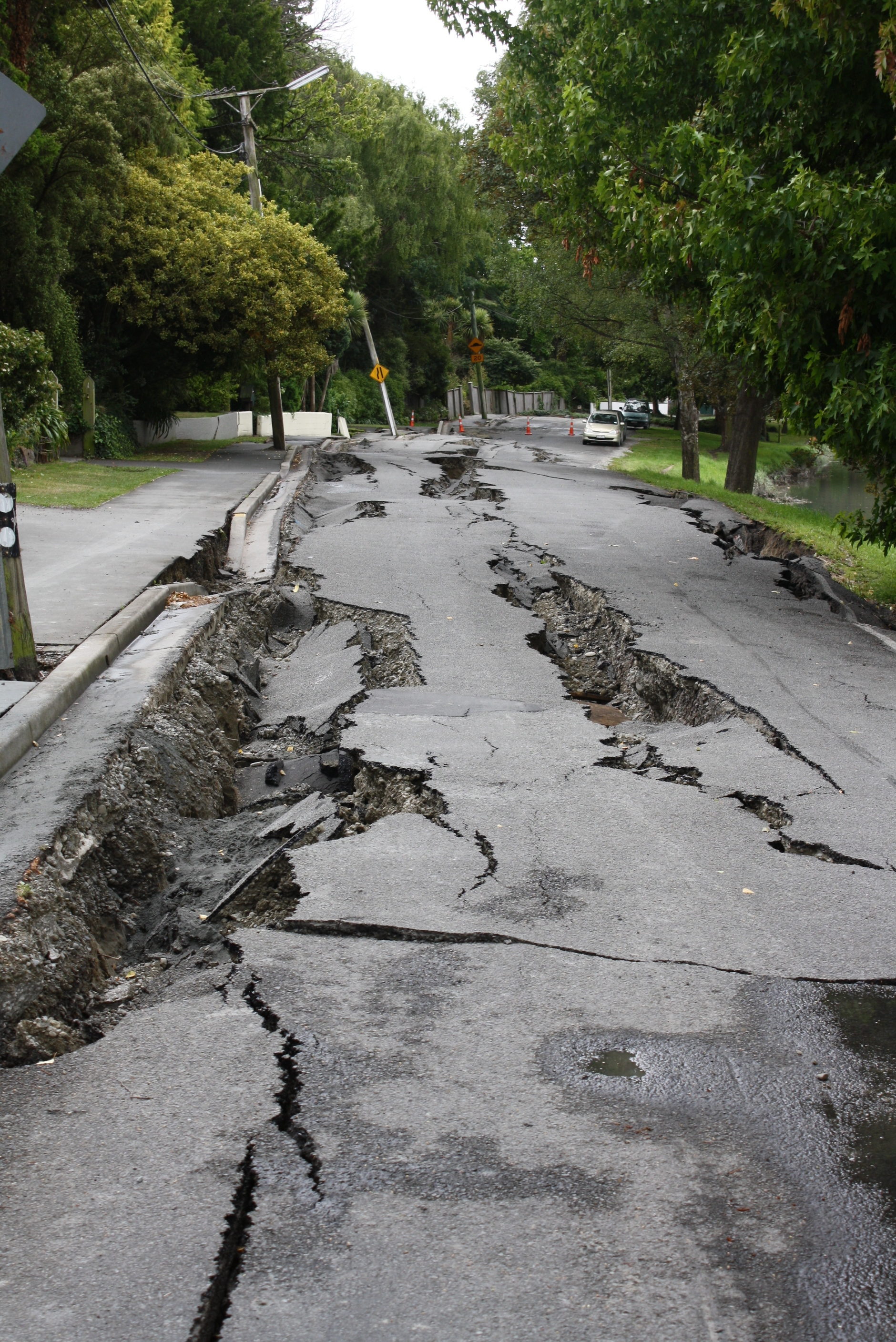
The effects of lateral spreading (River Road in Christchurch following the 2011 Christchurch earthquake)

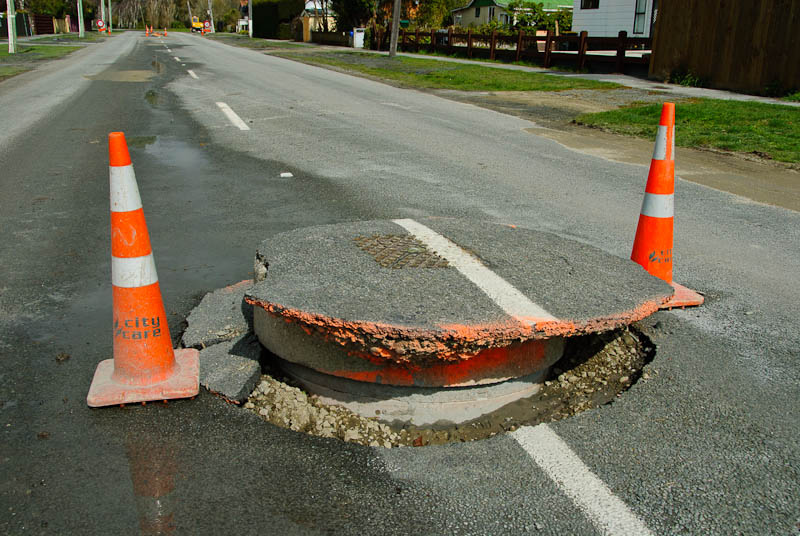
Damage in Brooklands from the 2010 Canterbury earthquake, where buoyancy caused by soil liquefaction pushed up an underground service including this manhole

The effects of soil liquefaction on the built environment can be extremely damaging. Buildings whose foundations bear directly on sand which liquefies will experience a sudden loss of support, which will result in drastic and irregular settlement of the building causing structural damage, including cracking of foundations and damage to the building structure, or leaving the structure unserviceable, even without structural damage. Where a thin crust of non-liquefied soil exists between building foundation and liquefied soil, a 'punching shear' type foundation failure may occur. Irregular settlement may break underground utility lines. The upward pressure applied by the movement of liquefied soil through the crust layer can crack weak foundation slabs and enter buildings through service ducts and may allow water to damage building contents and electrical services.

Bridges and large buildings constructed on pile foundations may lose support from the adjacent soil and buckle or come to rest at a tilt.

Sloping ground and ground next to rivers and lakes may slide on a liquefied soil layer (termed 'lateral spreading'), opening large ground fissures, and can cause significant damage to buildings, bridges, roads and services such as water, natural gas, sewerage, electric power and telecommunications installed in the affected ground. Buried tanks and manholes may float in the liquefied soil due to buoyancy. Earth embankments such as flood levees and earth dams may lose stability or collapse if the material comprising the embankment or its foundation liquefies.

Over geological time, liquefaction of soil material due to earthquakes could provide a dense parent material in which the fragipan may develop through pedogenesis.

== Mitigation methods ==
Mitigation methods have been devised by earthquake engineers and include various soil compaction techniques such as vibro compaction (compaction of the soil by depth vibrators), dynamic compaction, and vibro stone columns. These methods densify soil and enable buildings to avoid soil liquefaction.

Existing buildings can be mitigated by injecting grout into the soil to stabilize the layer of soil that is subject to liquefaction. Another method called IPS (Induced Partial Saturation) is now practicable to apply on larger scale. In this method, the saturation degree of the soil is decreased.

Other, environmental friendly mitigation methods have been recently developed, such as natural and synthetic fibers, recycled materials, or biological materials.

== Quicksand ==
Quicksand forms when water saturates an area of loose sand, and the sand is agitated. When the water trapped in the batch of sand cannot escape, it creates liquefied soil that can no longer resist force. Quicksand can be formed by standing or (upwards) flowing underground water (as from an underground spring), or by earthquakes. In the case of flowing underground water, the force of the water flow opposes the force of gravity, causing the granules of sand to be more buoyant. In the case of earthquakes, the shaking force can increase the pressure of shallow groundwater, liquefying sand and silt deposits. In both cases, the liquefied surface loses strength, causing buildings or other objects on that surface to sink or fall over.

The saturated sediment may appear quite solid until a change in pressure, or a shock initiates the thixotropic liquefaction, causing the sand to form a suspension with each grain surrounded by a thin film of water. This cushioning gives quicksand, and other liquefied sediments, a spongy, fluidlike texture. Objects in the liquefied sand sink to the level at which the weight of the object is equal to the weight of the displaced sand/water mix and the object floats due to its buoyancy.

== Quick clay ==
Quick clay, known as Leda Clay in Canada, is a water-saturated gel, which in its solid form resembles highly sensitive clay. This clay has a tendency to change from a relatively stiff condition to a liquid mass when it is disturbed. This gradual (but sometimes rapid) change in appearance from solid to liquid is a process known as spontaneous liquefaction or thixotropy. The clay retains a solid structure despite its high-water content (up to 80% by volume), because surface tension holds water-coated flakes of clay together. When the structure is broken by a shock or sufficient shear, it enters a fluid state.

Quick clay is found only in northern countries such as Russia, Canada, Alaska in the U.S., Norway, Sweden and Finland, which were glaciated during the Pleistocene epoch.

Quick clay has been the underlying cause of many deadly landslides. In Canada alone, it has been associated with more than 250 mapped landslides. Some of these are ancient, and may have been triggered by earthquakes.

== Turbidity currents ==
Submarine landslides are turbidity currents and consist of water-saturated sediments flowing downslope. An example occurred during the 1929 Grand Banks earthquake that struck the continental slope off the coast of Newfoundland. Minutes later, transatlantic telegraph cables began breaking sequentially, further and further downslope, away from the epicenter. Twelve cables were snapped in a total of 28 places. The exact times and locations were recorded for each break. Investigators suggested that a 60-mile-per-hour (100 km/h) submarine landslide or turbidity current of water-saturated sediments swept 400 miles (600 km) down the continental slope from the earthquake's epicenter, snapping the cables as it passed.

== See also ==
- Atterberg limits
- Dry quicksand
- Earthflow
- Earthquake engineering
- Fluidization
- Liquefaction
- Mud volcano
- Mudflow
- Network for Earthquake Engineering Simulation#Soil liquefaction research
- Paleoseismology
- Subsidence
