= Palu IV Bridge =

Palu IV Bridge Jembatan Palu IV
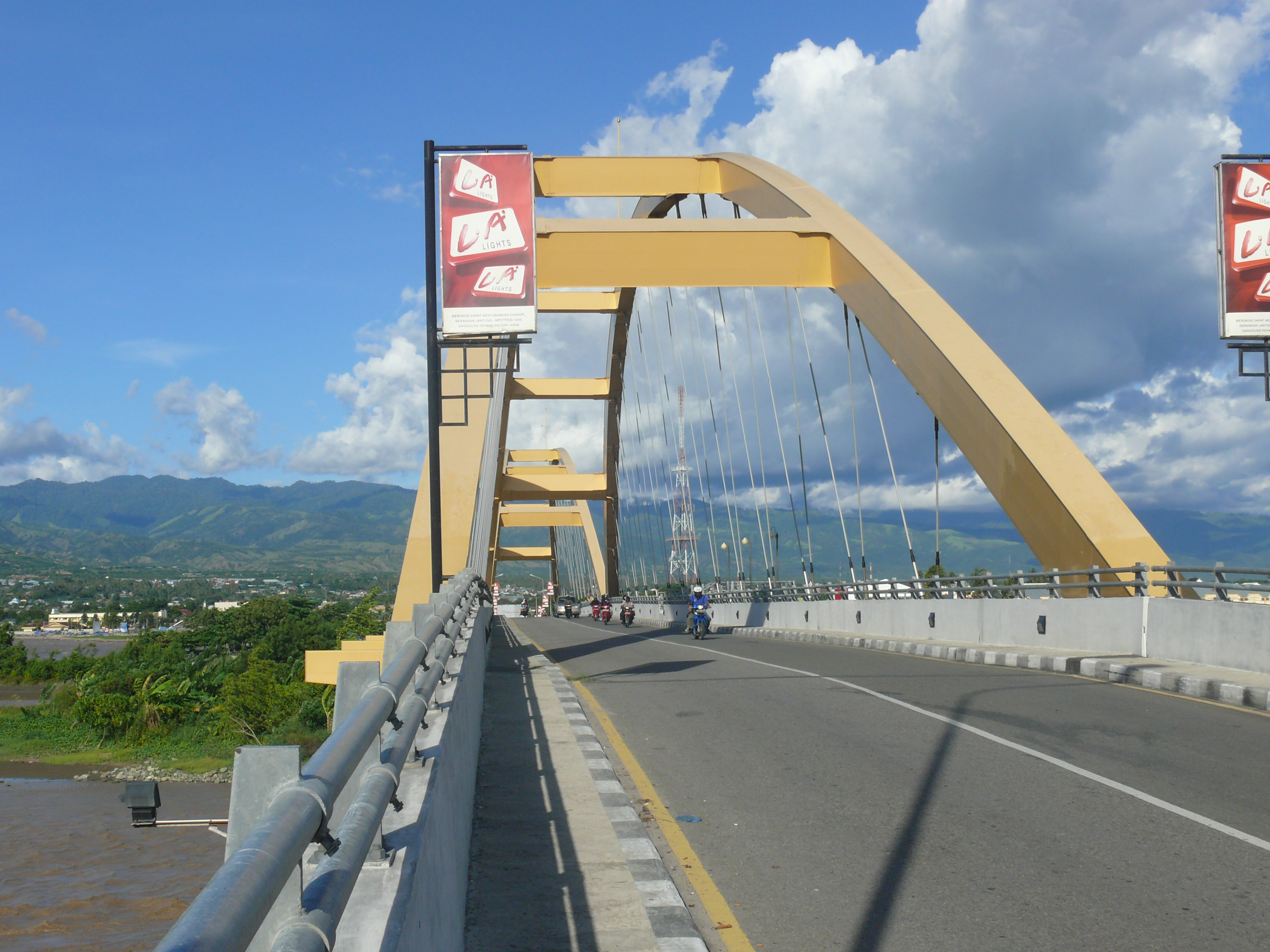
- Palu IV Bridge in 2010
- Coordinates: 0°53′8″S 119°51′32″E
- Crossed: Palu River
- Locale: Central Sulawesi, Indonesia

Characteristics
- Design: Arch bridge
- Total length: 250 m (820 ft)
- Width: 7.5 m (25 ft)
- Height: 20.2 m (66 ft)
- Longest span: 250 meters
- No. of spans: ~300 meters

History
- Opened: May 2006
- Collapsed: 28 September 2018

Location
- Interactive map of Palu IV Bridge

The Palu IV Bridge (Palu 4 Bridge) was an Indonesian suspension bridge that was located in city of Palu in the Indonesian province of Central Sulawesi. It spanned the Palu River, directly at its mouth in Palu Bay, and thus connected the districts of Besuru (East Palu) and Lere (West Palu).

The Palu IV Bridge was the first arch bridge on Sulawesi. It was inaugurated in May 2006 by President Susilo Bambang Yudhoyono and had two yellow arches, the middle pillar stood on a small river island. The total length was 250 metres (820 ft), the maximum height of the structure 20.5 metres (67 ft) and the width 7.5 metres (25 ft).

On 28 September 2018, the bridge was hit and destroyed by the 2018 Sulawesi earthquake and tsunami.

The government announced that it would rebuild the bridge, taking earthquake safety factors into account. The Japanese development agency JICA is supporting the reconstruction with 2.5 billion yen.

On February 13, 2026, the bridge has been completed and anyone can use it.
