= 2018 Sulawesi earthquake and tsunami =

7 Mw earthquake and tsunami in Indonesia

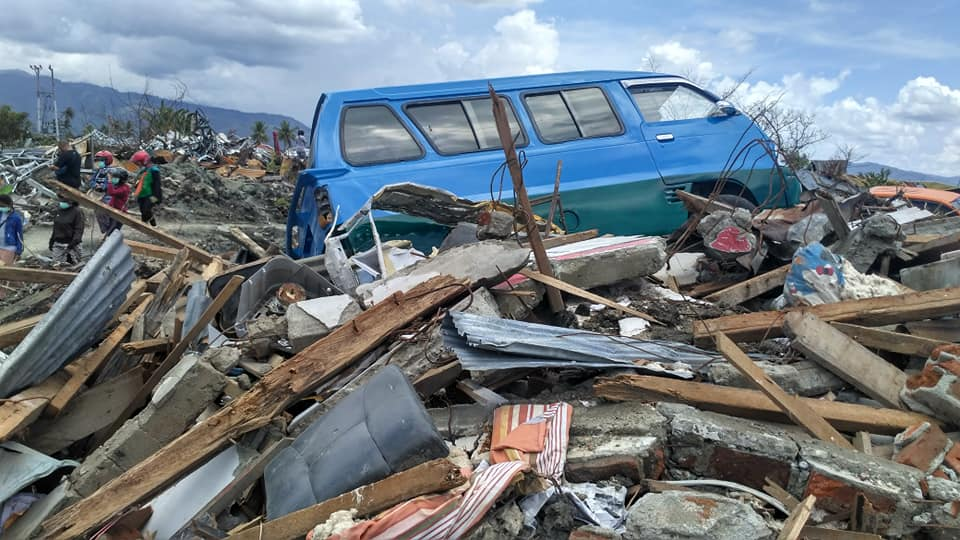
- The village of Petobo after the earthquake.

- Location within Sulawesi Location within Indonesia
- UTC time: 2018-09-28 10:02:44
- ISC event: 616642238
- USGS-ANSS: ComCat
- Local date: 28 September 2018
- Local time: 18:02:44 WITA (Indonesia Central Standard Time)
- Magnitude: M_{w} 7.5–7.6
- Depth: 20.0 km (12.4 mi)
- Epicentre: 0.178°S 119.840°E
- Fault: Palu-Koro fault
- Type: Strike-slip
- Total damage: Rp24.6 trillion (US$1.71 billion)
- Max. intensity: MMI X (Extreme)
- Peak acceleration: >1.54 g
- Tsunami: 10.7 m (35 ft) in Donggala Regency
- Landslides: Yes
- Foreshocks: M_{w}5.0–6.1
- Aftershocks: 32 (As of 31 December 2018)
- Casualties: 4,340 dead; 10,679 injured; 667 missing; 70,821 evacuated; (longer term) 206,524 made refugees as of 10/28

On 28 September 2018, a shallow, large earthquake struck in the neck of the Minahasa Peninsula, Indonesia, with its epicentre located in the mountainous Donggala Regency, Central Sulawesi. The magnitude 7.5–7.6 quake was located 70 km (43 mi) away from the provincial capital Palu and was felt as far away as Samarinda on East Kalimantan and also in Tawau, Malaysia. This event was preceded by a sequence of foreshocks, the largest of which was a magnitude 6.1 tremor that occurred earlier that day.

Following the mainshock, a tsunami alert was issued for the nearby Makassar Strait. A localised tsunami struck Palu, sweeping shore-lying houses and buildings on its way. The combined effects of the earthquake and tsunami led to the deaths of an estimated 4,340 people. This makes it the deadliest earthquake to strike the country since the 2006 Yogyakarta earthquake, as well as the deadliest earthquake worldwide in 2018, surpassing the previous earthquake that struck Lombok nearly two months earlier, killing more than 500. The Indonesian Agency for Meteorology, Climatology and Geophysics (BMKG) confirmed that a tsunami had been triggered, with its height reaching an estimated maximum of 4 to 7 metres (13 to 23 ft), striking the settlements of Palu, Donggala and Mamuju along its path.

The earthquake caused major soil liquefaction in areas in and around Palu. In two locations this led to mudflows in which many buildings became submerged causing hundreds of deaths with many more missing. The liquefaction was considered to be the largest in the world and was deemed as rare.

== Tectonic setting ==
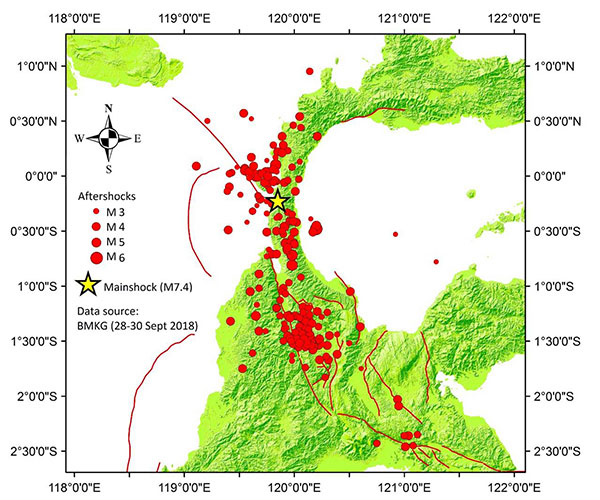
Locations of earthquakes and surface traces of main faults near the epicentre. The Palu-Koro fault is shown as two disconnected red lines indicated by arrows.

Sulawesi lies within the complex zone of interaction between the Australian, Pacific, Philippine and Sunda plates in which many small microplates are developed. The main active structure onshore in the western part of Central Sulawesi is the left-lateral NNW-SSE trending Palu-Koro strike-slip fault that forms the boundary between the North Sula and Makassar blocks. The rate of slip along this fault is estimated to be in the range 30–40 mm per year. At Palu, there are several parallel fault strands defining the margins of a pull-apart basin, each of which take up some of the overall slip. Several major earthquakes have been attributed to movement on this fault since 1900 and three larger events in the last 2,000 years have been deduced from studies of the fault zone. In 2017, a study recognised this fault as representing the greatest seismic risk in eastern Indonesia.

== Earthquake ==
Map of the Sulawesi earthquake

=== Foreshocks ===
The mainshock was preceded by a sequence of foreshocks starting about three hours earlier with a M6.1 event, followed by several others, all located in the area immediately south of the mainshock epicentre.

The first foreshock occurred at 15:00 WITA (Indonesia Central Standard Time). The earthquake struck at a shallow depth of 10 km with a magnitude of 5.9 M_{L}(BMKG). The USGS registered the size of the quake as 6.1 M_{w}. Strong shaking was felt in Donggala. At least 1 person was killed by fallen debris while 10 others were injured. Authorities confirmed that dozens of structures were either damaged or destroyed in the quake.

=== Mainshock ===
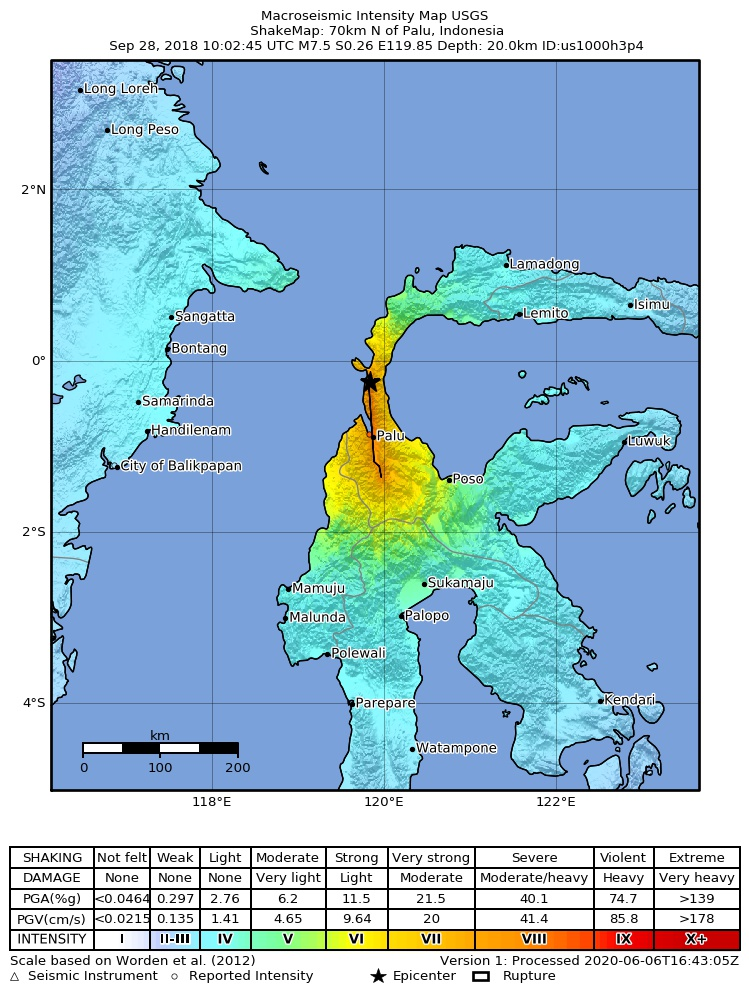
Shakemap of the 2018 Sulawesi earthquake

The mainshock occurred at 18:02 WITA, during rush hour traffic. The shaking was felt as far away as Samarinda, the capital of East Kalimantan, to the west and Makassar in the south. It was also felt in several parts in Gorontalo, located on the north and was also felt in Tawau, Malaysia. Violent shaking was reported in Donggala and Palu. Blackouts occurred throughout the area and telecommunications went down. The state-owned Telkomsel reported that more than 500 wireless communication towers had been damaged by the earthquake.

The earthquake struck during the 40th anniversary of the city of Palu. To commemorate the anniversary, the Government of Palu on each year holds a festival, the Palu Nomoni Festival, with its starting point from Wina Hotel to Talise Beach, stretching almost 3.8 kilometres on the coast of Palu. Hundreds of people had gathered on the beach. The festival was expected to attract international paragliders as an international paragliding event was also being held as a part of the festival. Hotel owners in Palu reported that the number of guests had risen significantly due to the festival. In the immediate aftermath of the earthquake, the festival resumed.

The mainshock magnitude was initially reported as M_{w} 7.7 by both the United States Geological Survey (USGS) and BMKG. The USGS later revised their estimate to M_{ww} 7.5. The International Seismological Centre (ISC) reported a magnitude of M_{w} 7.6. The focal mechanism of the earthquake showed that it was caused by strike-slip faulting on faults trending either roughly north–south or west–east. Further analysis of seismic waveforms suggests that a fault trending north–south gives a better fit. The earthquake was caused by movement on the Palu-Koro fault. Geodetic evidence suggests that about 150 km of the fault ruptured.

During the mainshock, the rupture propagated at speeds in excess of the S wave velocity as determined by back-projection of teleseismic data, and supported by satellite geodesy. The possibility of supershear rupture on the Palu-Koro Fault was raised in 2017.

Indonesian authorities confirmed that no one had been able to contact a single person from Donggala, the closest town to the epicentre. As of 1 October, contacts were still hampered by downed telecommunication lines.

=== Aftershocks ===
The mainshock was followed by a series of aftershocks, with 14 of M≥5.0 in the first 24 hours. Since then, a total of 150 aftershocks have struck the region.

=== Intensity ===
The earthquake was felt over a wide area. The strongest shaking (MMI X) was felt in some parts of Palu City. In other areas of the city, the Mercalli intensity was evaluated to be VII, based on damage in single and double-story buildings. Four-story structures like a hotel and shopping mall moderate to heavy damage and the intensity was assigned VIII. Major damage to the Palu IV Bridge was eventually given MMI IX.

== Tsunami ==
A tsunami warning was issued in Palu and Donggala at 18:07 WITA. Warnings were sent via SMS by the Indonesian Ministry of Communication and Information. Residents of Donggala were told to expect tsunamis with heights of 0.5 to 3 metres, while residents in Palu were told to expect tsunamis with heights of less than 0.5 metres. The tsunami, however, struck higher than expected. Residents of Palu reported waves with heights of more than 2 metres while several others stated that the waves managed to reach the second floor.

Indonesian officials calculated the estimated time of arrival of the tsunami. Calculations suggested that the tsunami would arrive in Palu approximately 20 minutes after the earthquake. Around 18:27 WITA, the BMKG in Mamuju detected tsunamis. A tsunami warning was issued, and later lifted. The BMKG claimed the warning was lifted after the tsunami had struck, the timing is clear, but since there was a one-hour time difference between the sunset in Palu and Java where many Indonesian in social media reside, many thought the warning was lifted before the tsunami hit, because the video that circulating around was after the sunset, while the warning lifted around 18:27 WITA it was 17:27 WIB for most of these people reside where the sun is still high up, resulting in the agency being criticized on social media.

Even though officials did send warnings via telephone and television, tsunami alarms were not activated. The Palu Nomoni Festival in Talise Beach continued and most of the festival attendees did not realize that there was a possibility of a tsunami. Eyewitnesses even stated that some people were still strolling on the beach when the tsunami struck. It was estimated that hundreds were caught off guard and swept away by the waves.

The BMKG later admitted that the tsunami detectors in Palu were damaged in the earthquake. The shaking was violent enough to damage the tsunami detectors in Palu, as further examination revealed that none of the detectors were able to send signals to alert residents.

As Palu was located at the end of a narrow bay, the tsunami's force was intensified when the waters entered. Officials confirmed that the waves that struck Palu had actually reached a height of 5 metres, with some as nearly as high as 6 metres.

The size of the tsunami surprised geologists. It was expected to be at a low height, no more than about two metres, since the earthquake was a strike-slip earthquake, which usually do not have enough vertical movement to create large tsunamis. One explanation is that the earthquake triggered underwater landslides, causing the tsunami. A study of coastal liquefaction has suggested that 84% of the tsunami amplitude was a result of the combined effect of coastal and submarine landslides, based on an analysis of tide gauge records at Pantoloan. A 2019 research suggests the earthquake created about 1.5 meters of vertical seafloor movement, which, combined with a very fast rupture speed, could have produced the tsunami, regardless of any landslides.

== Damage ==
Satellite view of the destruction in Palu

More than 70,000 houses are reported to be damaged, forcing tens of thousands of people to live in shelters and tents. In Palu, the capital of Central Sulawesi, a mosque and a major section of the Antapura Hospital collapsed. Palu's Tatura Mall, one of the oldest shopping centres in Palu, collapsed, trapping dozens of people. An eight-story hotel, identified as the Roa-Roa Hotel, had also collapsed, trapping numerous hotel guests, several of whom were participants of the Palu's annual paragliding festival. At the time of the earthquake, 76 of the 80 bedrooms of the hotel were occupied.

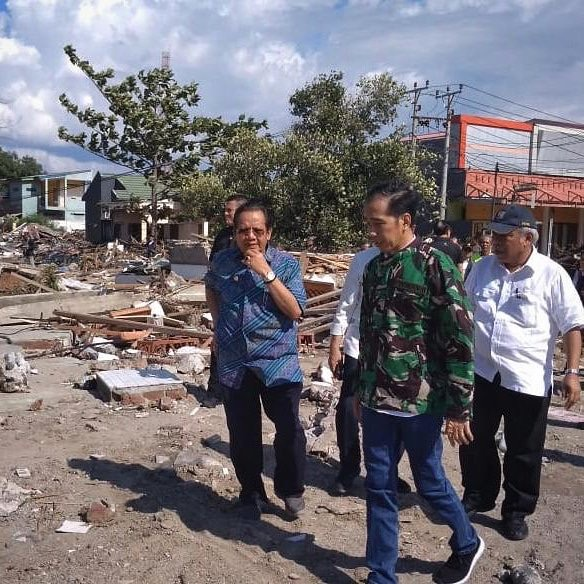
President Joko Widodo viewing collapsed buildings in Palu

Palu's Mutiara SIS Al-Jufrie Airport was forced to close as large cracks, one of which was 500 meters long, had been formed on the runway. Airport officials confirmed that the navigation system was damaged and the control tower of the airport collapsed. An air traffic controller, who was watching the take-off roll of Batik Air Flight 6231 during the earthquake, was killed due to internal injuries. Major structural damage was also reported in the airport, with the roof the airport's terminal reportedly caved in. The airport was reopened for limited operation on 29 September 2018. Due to the damage in the airport, hundreds of passengers were stranded and were told to wait in the airport's apron. Normal operation returned on service on 30 September.

Authorities confirmed that numerous settlements and residential areas, including more than a thousand homes, had been destroyed by the earthquake and tsunami. The tsunami also caused major damage to ports in Palu. In Pantoloan Harbour, a Quay crane collapsed and was swept by the tsunami. In Wani Harbour, structural damage was reported, while Ogoamas Harbour moved 3 cm to its right due to the earthquake. The IAIN Datokarama Palu, a university in Palu, was severely damaged by the tsunami.

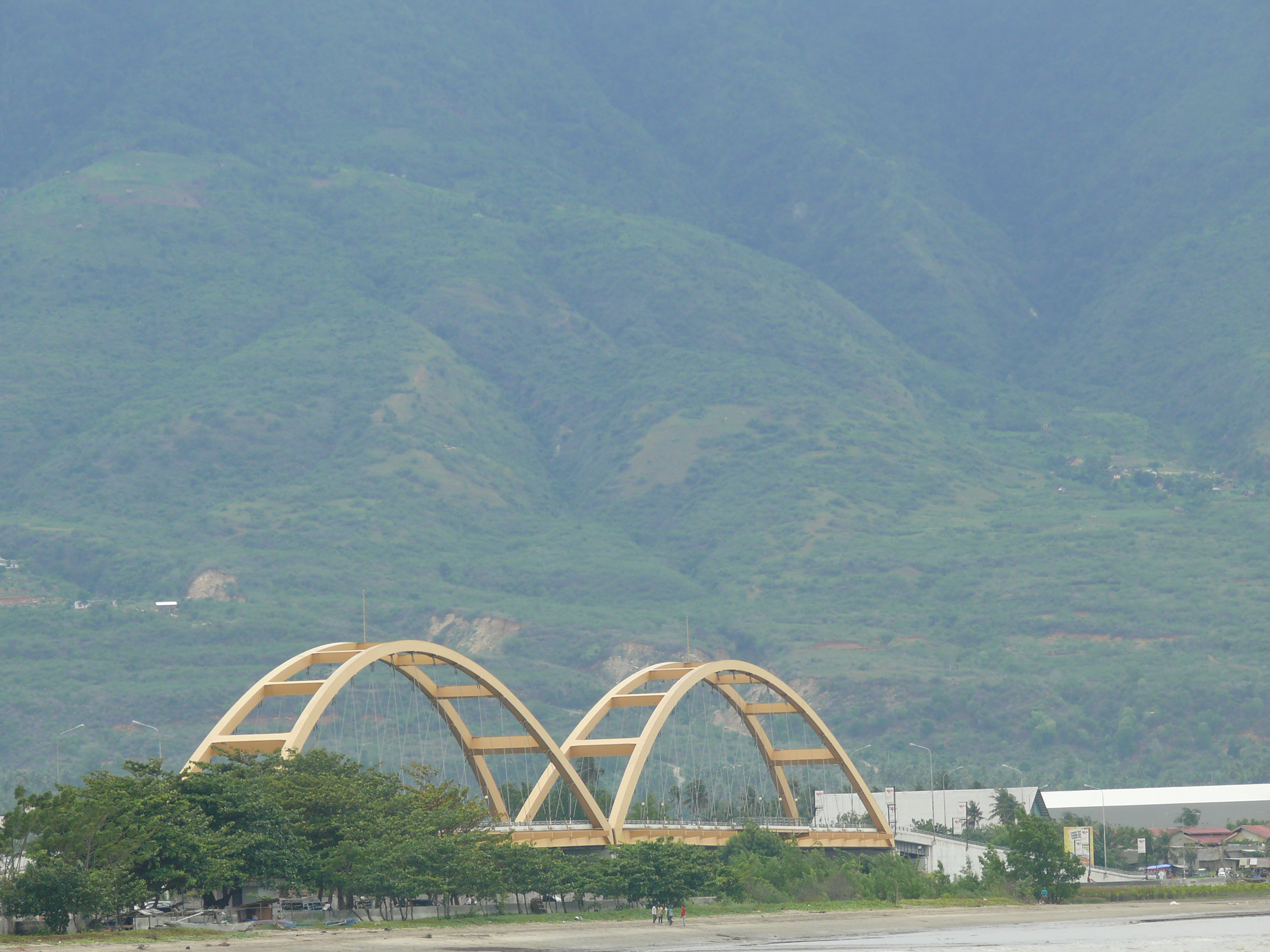
The Kuning Ponulele Bridge (pictured in 2010) was destroyed in the earthquake

Officials confirmed that Palu's iconic bridge, the Kuning Ponulele Bridge, also called Palu IV Bridge, which was also the first arch bridge in Indonesia, was destroyed by the earthquake and the ensuing tsunami. Roads to and from the city, connecting it to Makassar and Poso, were also severely damaged. There were also reports of landslides.

Of the 24 mosques in Palu, 20 were severely damaged. Only a few survived, including the iconic Floating Mosque of Palu which was partially submerged underwater. The worst-hit mosque was the Baiturrahman Mosque where 300 worshippers were killed during the evening prayers.

Communication to the affected area was severely hampered, with President Joko Widodo being initially unable to contact governor Longki Djanggola. Ministry of Communication and Information Technology announced that 1,678 base transceiver station in Central Sulawesi were damaged by the earthquake and disaster. Local hospitals were damaged, with the Director of the Palu Undata Hospital opting to treat victims outside of the hospital and made a public plea for tents, medicine, canvas, and nurses. A warden for a prison in Palu reported that more than half of its 560 inmates fled in panic as the prison walls collapsed.

An assessment made by the Ministry of Education and Culture showed that nearly 3,000 schools had been damaged by the earthquake and tsunami and more than 100,000 students and 20,000 teachers were affected. Minister of Education and Culture Muhadjir Effendi stated that a period of minimum 1 year would be needed to rebuild and repair the damaged schools in the affected areas.

In the immediate aftermath of the earthquake, prisoners in the Donggala Penitentiary in Central Sulawesi rioted and set the prison on fire as they demanded to be met by their families. At least 100 prisoners managed to escape. The prison reportedly suffered severe damage.

Minister of Agriculture Amran Sulaiman stated that the earthquake, tsunami and subsequent soil liquefaction damaged 9,718 hectares of crops throughout Palu, Sigi and Donggala, costing 36 billion rupiah in damage.

Overall damage from the earthquake, tsunami and liquefaction was Rp24.6 trilion (US$1.71 billion), while damage in Palu alone reached Rp23.9 trillion (US$1.66 billion).

== Mudflows ==
Parts of Central Sulawesi had been hit by major mudflows following the earthquake as a result of liquefaction. The most affected areas were the Petobo sub-district in southern Palu and the village of Balaroa, just outside the city, both locations some distance from the coast.

In Petobo, at least 34 Indonesian students from a Bible camp were killed, but it is suspected that many others are dead. Most of the district's 744 houses had been destroyed and 200 bodies were retrieved. Survivors of the mudflow in Petobo stated that as soon as the earthquake struck, 2-meter-high mud came out from the ground. Survivors also recalled that the ground immediately turned into liquid-like substance. Hundreds of houses sank into the soil and hundreds of people were drowned by the mudflow. Out of the 13,000 inhabitants in Petobo, 6,000 are thought to have been buried by the mud. Indonesian National Board for Disaster Management announced that 2,050 houses were destroyed by the mudflow in Petobo and an area of 180 hectares were shifted by the liquefaction.

Balaroa almost disappeared as the ground collapsed, with most of the village's 1,747 houses sinking into the mud. Of the 2,000 inhabitants, 600 are known to have died, while more than a thousand are still missing. The liquefaction reportedly shifted an area of 47.8 hectares. Several places were shifted to the north while several others were shifted to the west and southwest.

Major soil liquefaction was reported in Sigi Regency, which was located south of Palu. Numerous eyewitnesses stated that the total amount of liquid released by the soil was so immense that buildings and structures were swept away. There were also reports that a whole village was gone. The liquefaction shifted an area of 202 hectares.

The major liquefaction shifted hundreds of structures in Palu and Sigi. In Sigi, the Jono Oge village was shifted 3 km from its initial position. The village was replaced by corn fields, which was also shifted from the mountain up in the north of the village. The liquefaction also reportedly managed to shift the overhead electrical tower in the area to several hundred meters from its initial position. In Palu, hundreds of houses "crashed into each other" when the liquefaction occurred, with some shifted to the north and some shifted to the southwest. Roads also became twisted due to the liquefaction. Similar reports also came from Balaroa where houses reportedly spun and crashed into each other. The liquefaction in Jono Oge and Palu was recorded on camera.

On 11 October, the Indonesian Government decided to stop the search and rescue operation in Petobo, Balaroa and Jono Oge. The Governor of Central Sulawesi Longki Djanggola agreed to build memorial parks in Petobo, Balaroa and Jono Oge to commemorate thousands of victims who were killed in the disaster.

== Casualties ==
The 6.1 magnitude foreshock occurred at 15:00 local time while the 7.5 magnitude earthquake on the evening caused severe destruction in Palu, Donggala and Sigi, destroying hundreds of structures. At least 4,340 people are estimated to have died as a result of the disaster and more than 10,000 others injured or had brain concussion, of which 4,612 were seriously injured.

=== Palu ===
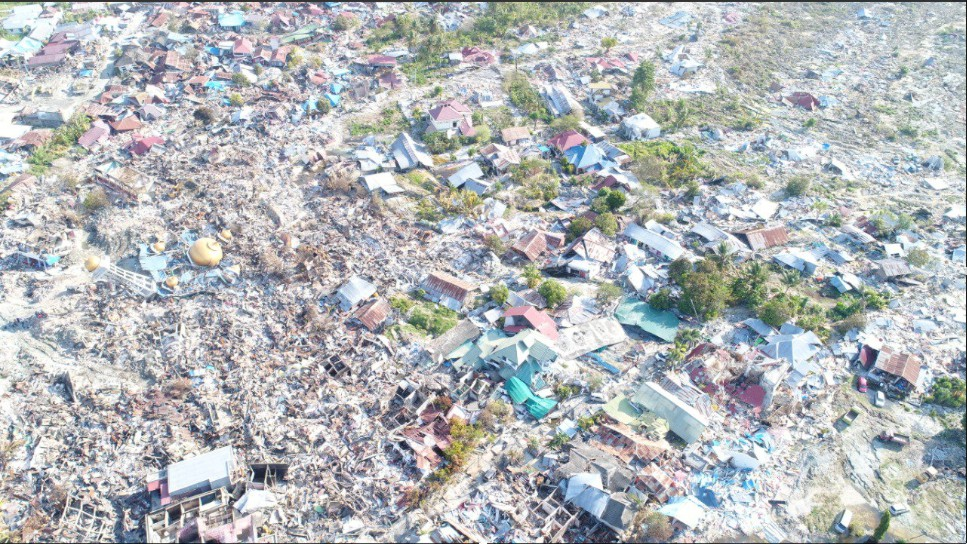
Balaroa, a district in Palu, was obliterated by the soil liquefaction that followed immediately after the earthquake

On the evening of 28 September, earthquakes followed by a tsunami struck the city. The first place that was hit by the tsunami was the beach where a festival named Festival Pesona Palu Nomoni was ongoing. The majority of the partygoers were later recovered dead from the beach and the sea. Several others were injured.

Local residents stated that many bodies were lined and laid on the side of the street and many were also found on the shoreline. Survivors reported a pungent smell of dead bodies in Petobo. Vice president Jusuf Kalla said on the day after the disaster that the death toll was likely to increase to more than a thousand, adding that he based his statements on his past experience from the 2004 Indian Ocean earthquake and tsunami.

On 30 September 2018, officials from the Indonesian National Search and Rescue Agency reported that at least 100 people were trapped inside Tatura Mall, the oldest and the largest shopping center in Palu. Another 50–60 people were still trapped inside the rubble of the 8-story Roa-Roa Hotel, many of whom were heard crying for help. Officials admitted that lack of heavy equipment hampered the search and rescue effort.

Indonesian authorities stated that at least 200 survivors in Palu will be evacuated with a Hercules C-130 to Makassar, some for further medical treatment. According to officials, nearly 17,000 people in Palu had been displaced by the earthquake and tsunami. The Head of Data, Information and Public Relations Center of Indonesian National Board for Disaster Management, Sutopo Purwo Nugroho, stated that around 2.4 million people were affected by the earthquake and tsunami.

Fearing that diseases might spread, the Indonesian Government decided to bury those who had been identified in mass graves. The Indonesian government had made at least one mass grave measuring 1,000 square meters. The grave could hold as much as 1,000 bodies. The Indonesian Government then added that they would probably make another as thousands of people had died in the provincial capital. On 1 October, at least 53 bodies were buried in another mass grave in Palu.

=== Donggala ===
From 28 to 29 September, the victims from Donggala could not be accounted for due to limited access and downed communication lines. In the next days, emergency workers arrived in the city. Donggala was heavily affected by the tsunami, with Banawa District being the worst affected district. Nearly all coastal houses were destroyed by the tsunami, which reportedly had struck Donggala at a height of more than 7 meters. Authorities stated that more than 150 people in Donggala had been killed by the disaster.

=== Sigi ===
The Indonesian National Board for Disaster Management stated that Sigi Regency was among the area with the most casualties. Reports from the city revealed that "dozens of people" were killed by the earthquake, including the 34 students from a Bible camp that died after being struck by a mudflow. There were also reports of "massive liquefaction" which caused homes to be swept away. Officials also reported that several aftershocks with magnitude of over 5.0 had struck Sigi, damaging more buildings and structures. At least 7 districts in Sigi were cut off due to landslides and damaged roads.

=== Parigi Moutong ===
Reports of damage were also received from Parigi Moutong. At least a mosque and a temple were damaged by the earthquake. Dozens of homes were also damaged. Authorities stated that at least 15 people in Parigi Moutong were killed while 2 others were missing.

== Response ==
Indonesian President Joko Widodo immediately ordered the Coordinating Minister of Politics, Legal and Security Affairs Wiranto to coordinate the relief efforts in the affected areas. He had called the commander of the Indonesian National Armed Forces Hadi Tjahjanto for the emergency responses. He also stated that he will declare the earthquake and tsunami in Palu as a major disaster. He added that he had tried to call the governor of Central Sulawesi, whose office is in the city of Palu. However, due to disruption, the calls weren't able to be received. He later appealed for calm and urged people not to panic in response to the disaster.

Joko Widodo and several other prominent government officials, including head of the Indonesian National Search and Rescue Agency Bambang Soelistyo, commander of the Indonesian National Armed Forces Hadi Tjahjanto and some of his ministers visited the hardest hit areas on 30 September.

Coordinating Minister of Politics and Legal Affairs Wiranto stated that his Ministry will conduct a joint search and rescue effort with the Indonesian National Search and Rescue Agency, the Indonesian National Armed Forces, the BMKG and the Indonesian National Board for Disaster Management. Several personnel had been immediately deployed to the disaster zone. He also added that makeshift hospitals, shelters and crisis centres will be set up in multiple locations.

A 14-day emergency period, starting from 28 September, was set up in Central Sulawesi. This was later extended to 26 October.

A minute of silence was held during the opening ceremony of the 2018 Asian Para Games to honour the victims of the earthquake and tsunami.

The Indonesian Ministry of Communication and Information deployed at least 30 satellite phones to recover the communication in Palu. On 30 September 2018, the Ministry deployed 100 satellite phones to Sulawesi. Indonesian Ministry of Internal Affairs Tjahjo Kumolo ordered all regional governments in Indonesia to assist the government of Central Sulawesi in handling the disaster. He added that every regional governments in Sulawesi had been ordered to send emergency services and basic supplies to the survivors. On 29 September, he visited Palu to supervise the relief effort. Ministry of Health sent dozens of medical teams and medicines to the affected areas. The Ministry later stated that it would work together with the Indonesian National Armed Forces for the distribution. Military bases were also notified by the Ministry to send medical team to Palu and Donggala. Ministry of Transportation formed a Quick Response Team in Palu and would evaluate and inspect the infrastructures in the affected areas. Minister of Finance Sri Mulyani announced that the ministry would provide 560 billion rupiah for the recovery effort in Central Sulawesi. Minister of Agriculture Amran Sulaiman sent 500 trucks carrying logistics to Palu and Donggala.

In response to reports that hundreds of inmates had escaped from prisons throughout Central Sulawesi, the Ministry of Law and Human Rights announced an ultimatum for 1 week to the inmates to report and to return to the prison. A special forces unit was also formed by the ministry.

State-owned electric company PLN sent 125 personnel to Palu to check the electricity in the affected areas. State-owned petroleum company Pertamina sent 4,000 liters of diesel fuel from Tarakan to Palu. Indonesian National Lines (Pelni) stated that it will not impose fee to any kind of logistics and aid. Telecommunication company Telkom announced that it will provide free wifi services and telecommunication services in the affected areas. This was also followed by Indosat Ooredoo. It stated that residents in the affected area could use SMS service for free. Indonesian Bureau of Logistics sent rice, 5 tonnes of meat and other logistics to Palu and Donggala. Ministry of State-owned enterprises announced that a total of 20,000 LPG tanks had been distributed to 37 locations in Central Sulawesi.

Ministry of Research, Technology, and Higher Education M. Natsir stated that every college students in Palu who were affected by the disaster would be given scholarship from the government. 38 state universities in Indonesia also offered to the affected college students to temporarily study in their university.

The regional government of Jakarta announced that it would donate a total of 60 billion rupiah for the recovery effort. A total of 83 personnel were also sent to Central Sulawesi. The Government of Toli-Toli Regency sent 25 tonnes of rice, sembako and clothes to Donggala. East Luwu Regency sent 18 trucks carrying logistics, blankets and clothes to Palu, Donggala and Sigi while the regional government of East Java sent volunteers and medical team and donated 5 billion rupiah to the victims. The local government of Lamongan, East Java, sent 34 trucks carrying more than 4,000 boxes of mineral water, 15.89 tonnes of rice, 2,000 packages of sembako, canned foods and other aids to Central Sulawesi. West Sumatra sent 1.6 tonnes of rendang and donated 1 billion rupiah to the victims. Gorontalo sent 100 police personnel, 16 social workers, 14 marines, 15 BPBD personnel, 15 personnel from the local Indonesian Red Cross and 100 personnel from Korem 133/NWB. Medical team, ambulance, medicine and aids worth of 256 million rupiah were also sent to Palu and Donggala. Local government of Boalemo Regency sent blankets, foods and other essential aids as well as medical team and SAR personnel to Palu and Donggala. Disaster response team, Quick Response team, doctors, paramedics, and trucks carrying logistics and medicines were also sent by Takalar Regency, South Sulawesi. Regent of Jeneponto Regency Iksan Iskandar stated that his government will send logistics and donations to the victims of the disaster. East Kalimantan Province sent a ship carrying tents, clothes, and aids to Palu. Government of West Java donated 2 billion rupiah to the victims while the government of Central Java sent doctors, nurses and personnel from BPBD to Central Sulawesi. Government of Kampar, Riau — sent 3 tonnes of clothes, 4 tonnes of sembako and a donation of 300 million rupiah to Palu and Donggala.

Helicopters and ships were deployed from Borneo by the Indonesian National Search and Rescue Agency. Regional search and rescue agency from Bolaang Mongondow, Kendari and Makassar also sent dozens of personnel to assist the rescue efforts in Sulawesi. Makassar Red Cross stated that they will send 12 personnel and ambulances to the affected areas. Head of the Indonesian National Search and Rescue Agency Muhammad Syaugi stated that he had ordered the personnel from the regional search and rescue agency in Gorontalo, Banjarmasin and Balikpapan to assist the rescue operation in Palu.

In the following days, thousands of people began to evacuate from Palu, either via air or land. The Indonesian National Board for Disaster Management noted that, as of 11 October, 18,353 had evacuated from Palu. More than 16,000 people were evacuated to Makassar, Balikpapan, Samarinda, Surabaya, Tarakan or Jakarta. As people began to flee, reports of fuel shortages became widespread. The Indonesian state-owned oil company Pertamina stated that many of their gas stations had run out of fuel due to the mass exodus. Food shortage was reported throughout the city, and survivors screamed for foods outside a military command in Palu.

The city of Palu became chaotic as multiple convenience stores were looted. During a live TV broadcast of the rescue mission in Tatura Mall, the rescue attempt was interrupted as dozens of looter raided the mall. The Indonesian National Police initially condoned the looting for "emergency purpose" and the Indonesian Government, including President Joko Widodo and Commander of the Indonesian National Armed Forces Hadi Tjahjanto, initially refuted claims of widespread looting in Palu. The Indonesian Government was also heavily criticized by the public for allowing looting to take place for "emergency reasons". On 2 October, the Indonesian Government ordered the Indonesian National Police to capture any remaining looters. The Indonesian Government later clarified their statement. As aid distribution was hampered due to the destruction in the city, the government announced that any foods, drinks and essential aids that had been taken from any convenience store in Palu would be paid by the government.

There were also reports that trucks carrying logistics and fuel were looted in and around the city of Palu. Due to the rising number of looting, soldiers were also dispatched to secure any remaining convenience store and also to secure the aid distribution. The Indonesian National Police dispatched 1,400 personnel to Palu and Donggala while the Indonesian National Armed Forces sent 3 battalion of army. This resulted in minor clashes between authorities and locals.

=== International and private ===
A spokesperson for the Australian Department of Foreign Affairs and Trade, said that, while no official request for assistance had been made as of 29 September, it was ready to assist if international assistance were required. A UN spokesperson echoed this statement, and was in contact with the Government of Indonesia. On 30 September President Joko Widodo agreed to accept international and private sector aid.

On 30 September 2018, South Korea's Ministry of Foreign Affairs announced that Korean government will provide $1 million in humanitarian assistance and also consider dispatching Korea Disaster Relief Team (KDRT) after consultation with the relevant ministries and the Indonesian government. On 2 October 2018, Singapore Defence Minister Dr Ng Eng Hen announced that two Republic of Singapore Air Force C-130s were en route to Sulawesi to deliver humanitarian supplies–bottled water, meals, tents and medical supplies. As requested by the Indonesian Armed Forces (TNI), both aircraft will stay in Sulawesi to transport survivors to other cities of Indonesia that have better facilities to cope, as the tsunami destroyed much of the existing town. The Foreign Affairs Minister of New Zealand, Winston Peters, reported the country would contribute $1.6 million to assist in emergency response efforts, with support and contributions to the International Federation of the Red Cross and Red Crescent. Malaysia, through its Deputy Prime Minister Wan Azizah Wan Ismail, had telephoned Indonesian Vice-president Jusuf Kalla to inform him of the dispatchment of the SMART team for search-and-rescue efforts along with a donation of RM500,000 in aid for the victims. Taiwan also dispatched 36 specialists and six sniffer dogs from the New Taipei City Fire Department of the National Fire Agency (NFA) to assist in rescue efforts together with the donation of supplies, a medical team and 10,000 blankets for the victims from the Taiwanese Buddhist humanitarian organisation, the Tzu Chi Foundation. Vietnam offered US$100,000 in relief aid to help the Indonesian people recover from their recent earthquakes and tsunami.

The Philippine government has pledged $300,000 worth of humanitarian assistance which consist of six units of water filtration systems, six units of generator sets, tents and sleeping kits. The aid will be delivered by a 25-person contingent via a Lockheed C-130 Hercules cargo plane in two batches.

The European Union on 1 October pledged an initial €1.5 million in emergency humanitarian assistance to the country. The European Commission also dispatched a humanitarian expert to the region to coordinate European efforts.

On 2 October, the United States announced they would provide $100,000 through the United States Agency for International Development in initial aid and further assess the conditions on the ground, together with the Indonesian government, to see if more relief efforts are required.

Australia announced that it pledged $500,000 through the Indonesian Red Cross. On 3 October, Australia stated that an additional $5 million in aid would be provided to Indonesia. Australian Foreign Minister Marise Payne stated that the $5 million will include emergency healthcare support in the initial phase up to 21 days. Australia also offered assets from the Australian Defence Force to assist the relief effort.

Saudi Arabian Ambassador to Indonesia, Osama Mohammed Al Shuaibi, stated that the Saudi Government has distributed 370 tons of basic necessities, 5,000 units of health equipment, and 3,500 tents for the earthquake and tsunami victims in Palu, noting that the aids were from King Salman bin Abdulaziz and Prince Mohammed bin Salman.

Qatari Government sent a financial aid of $5 million to Indonesia for the relief effort in Lombok and Central Sulawesi.

Venezuelan President Nicolas Maduro announced that Venezuela would donate a total of $10 million in financial aid to the victims of the earthquake and tsunami, even though the country itself was facing a crisis.

The Spanish Government sent 255 tents worth of €265,000 and stated that it had allocated a total of €200,000 through the International Federation of Red Cross and Red Crescent Societies (IFRC) and €100,000 through non-governmental organization Save the Children. Turkish Government sent two Hercules C-130 aircraft carrying 1,000 sleeping bags, 250 tents and Turkish Red Crescent personnel.

Residents in Switzerland set up donation for the victims of the earthquake, with hotlines reportedly set up in the city of Zurich, Geneva, Lugano and Chur. A total of $6.25 million were collected from the public. Swiss News Agency reported that 900 kg of aids and 5 experts were also sent to Sulawesi.

The Salvation Army's Indonesia Emergency Services Team was activated in response and worked to assess the damage and needs of those injured or displaced by the tsunami. The United Kingdom's defense secretary announced that they were to send a RAF A400M Atlas aircraft, a team of military experts, and HMS Argyll, and make £2m of aid available for the relief effort.

Russian Ministry of Emergency Situations sent mobile electro-stations and other humanitarian aid.

Brunei donated BN$540,000 (around IDR 5.5 billion) to earthquake and tsunami victims in Central Sulawesi while BN$272,000 (IDR 2.8 billion) from existing donations submitted to the ASEAN Coordinating Centre for Humanitarian Assistance on Disaster Management (AHA Centre) for the construction of a temporary shelter for survivors.

The CEO of Google, Sundar Pichai, stated that Google would donate a total of $1 million for the relief effort and would activate the SOS alert in Palu and Donggala. Apple Inc. also offered to provide financial aid. Both WhatsApp and Facebook donated $1 million to the government of Indonesia.

Aid deliveries to affected areas were hampered by the vast destruction of the local infrastructure. Most roads are severely damaged and Palu's airport does not have the capacities to handle the large influx of material, leading to severe delays in aid distribution across the region.

== Aftermath ==
A month after the quake, 206,524 people had been made refugees. By April 2020, thousands were still without housing or hospital facilities, amidst the COVID-19 pandemic.

== See also ==
- List of earthquakes in 2018
- List of earthquakes in Indonesia
