= Paleoliquefaction =

Paleoliquefaction is any liquefaction features attributed to seismic events occurring before measurements or written records were kept of earthquakes. The study of these features can reveal a great deal about the seismicity of regions where large earthquakes happen infrequently. This is a subset of the broader field of paleoseismology.

Paleoliquefaction studies in areas like the New Madrid Seismic Zone, and the Wabash Valley have helped scientists and engineers determine the severity of ground shaking to expect when planning for future earthquakes.

== Paleoliquefaction features ==
The phenomenon of paleoliquefaction causes a soil to lose its shear strength and behave like a fluid. This liquefied soil (most often sand) flows like water, leaving several kinds of evidence behind in the geologic record.

=== Dikes ===
Dikes are intrusions of a lower liquefied sand that penetrate strata of an upper, non-liquefied soil. This penetration can occur due to hydraulic fracturing, where the non-liquefied layer is fractured by the water pressure in the liquefied layer. Lateral spreading, where portions of the non-liquefied layer move either towards relief in the topography or down-slope if the ground isn't level, can cause cracks to open in the non-liquefied layer and subsequently fill with liquefied soil. Additionally, the motion of the earthquake waves at the surface can cause cracks to form in a non-liquefied layer. These cracks fill with soil from the liquefied layer below. Dikes can range in size from an inch in width to several feet, depending on the severity of the liquefaction and the strength of the non-liquefied layer.

Dikes that don't result in sand boils (see below) can only be found in profile view because they don't leave evidence at the ground surface. They can be discovered by digging exploratory trenches in areas where moderate levels of liquefaction are thought to have occurred, or by studying the banks of streams that have cut down through existing strata.

=== Sand boils ===
Sand boils occur when a dike completely penetrates the non-liquefied layer above it and reaches the ground surface. The water pressure in the liquefied layer causes an eruption of liquefied soil at the ground surface, often resembling a volcano. This can carry large amounts of sand to the surface, covering areas tens of feet or more in diameter. This makes sand boils an easy paleoliquefaction feature to locate using aerial photography. In many areas of the New Madrid Seismic Zone, a significant portion of the ground can be covered by sand carried to the surface by sand boils.

== See also ==
- Seismite
