= Vibro stone column =

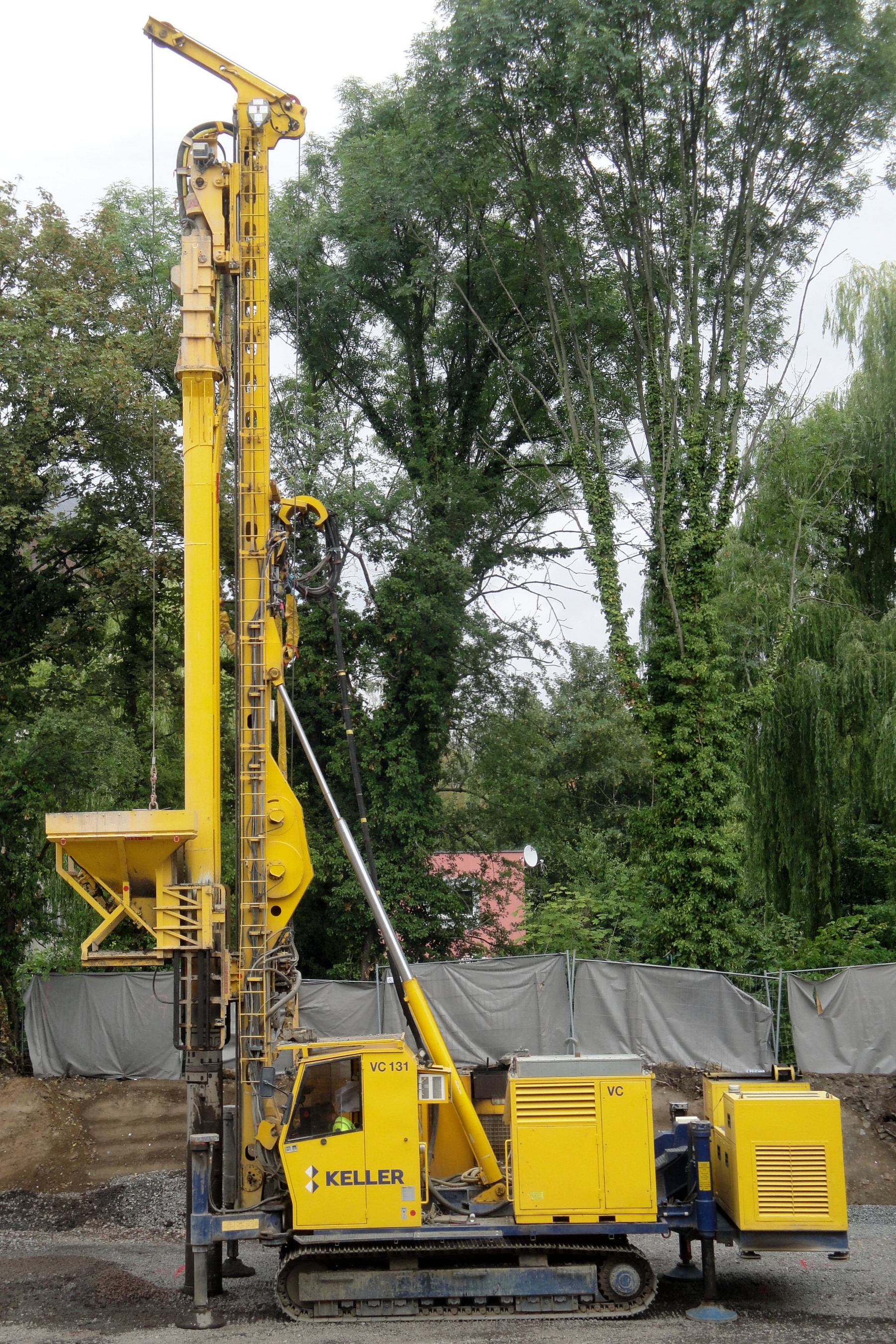

Vibro stone columns or aggregate piers are an array of crushed stone pillars placed with a vibrating tool into the soil below a proposed structure. This method of ground improvement is also called vibro replacement. Such techniques increase the load bearing capacity and drainage of the soil while reducing settlement and liquefaction potential. Stone columns are made across the area to be improved in a triangular or rectangular grid pattern. They have been used in Europe since the 1950s, and in the United States since the 1970s. Column depth depends on local soil strata, and usually penetrates weak soil.

During construction, a vibrating tool suspended from a crane penetrates to the design depth by means of its own weight and vibrations. Predrilling may be required in dense soil or may be used to reduce the amount of ground displacement during installation. Crushed stone is introduced into the hole by one of two methods. In the dry bottom method, a pipe attached to the vibrator supplies stone directly to it. In the wet top method, water jets located in the vibrator's tip create an annular space around the vibrator through which stone is introduced from the top.

The vibrating probe breaks down the pores of the surrounding soil, thereby densifying the soil. The stone that is poured in takes the place of the soil and keeps up the pressure on the soil that was created by the vibrating probe. The stone consists of crushed coarse aggregates of various sizes. The ratio in which the stones of different sizes will be mixed is decided by design criteria. Spacing and diameter of columns are also determined by design criteria.
