= Petobo =

Destroyed village in Indonesia

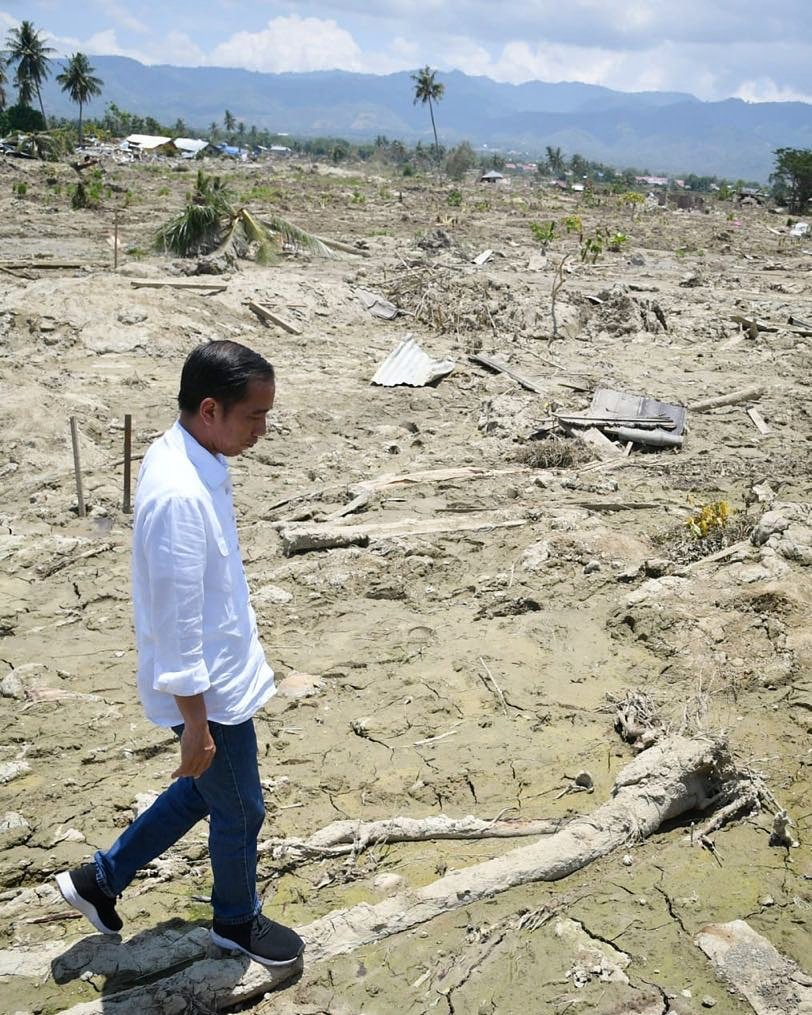
President Joko Widodo viewing the damage.

Petobo is a mostly abandoned urban village (kelurahan) in South Palu district, Palu, Central Sulawesi, Indonesia. The village was notable in 2018, when some of its areas were destroyed by a landslide triggered by the Sulawesi earthquake. Since then, it mostly has not been rebuilt due to its disaster vulnerability.

== Gallery ==
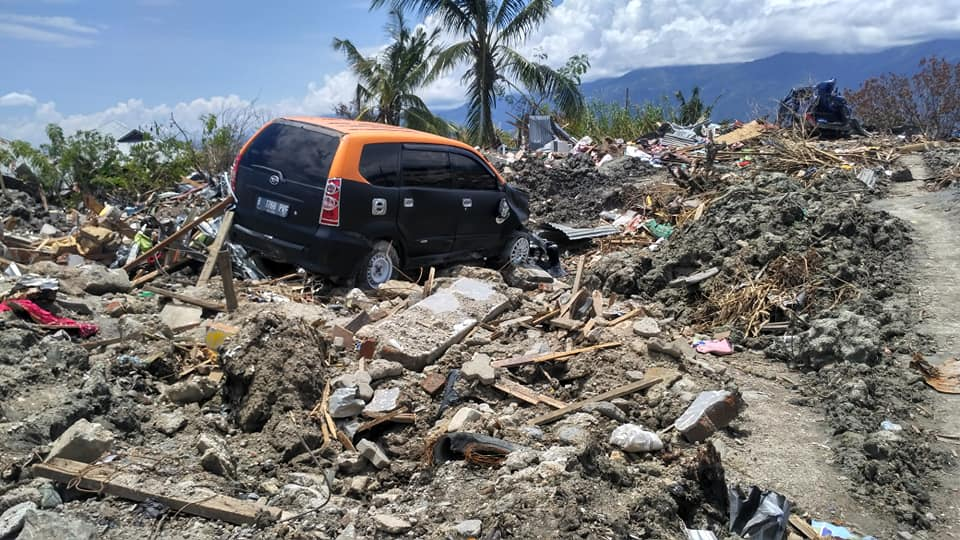

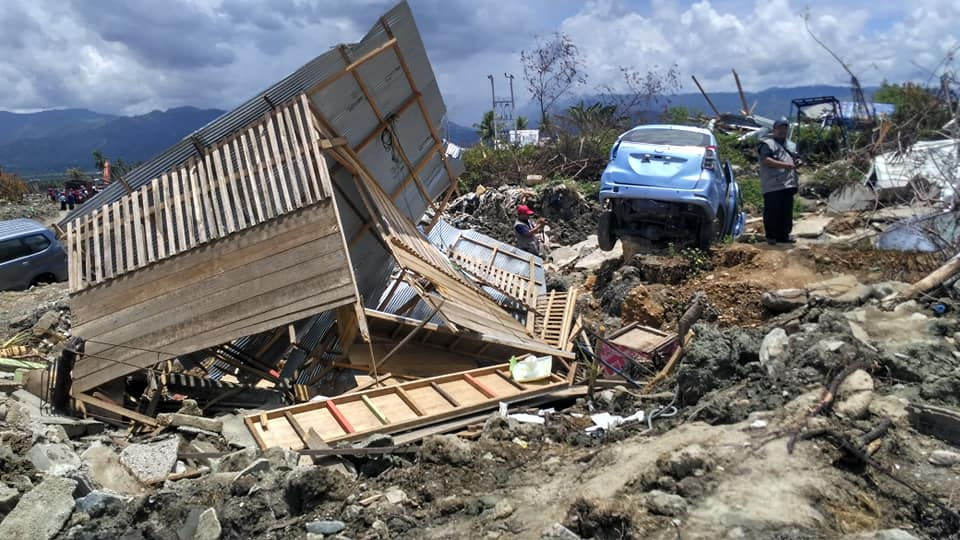

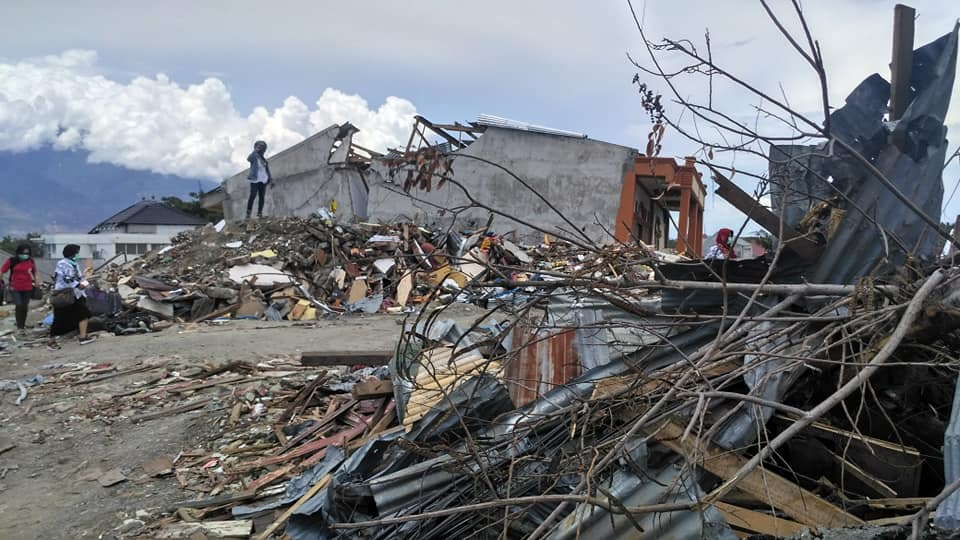

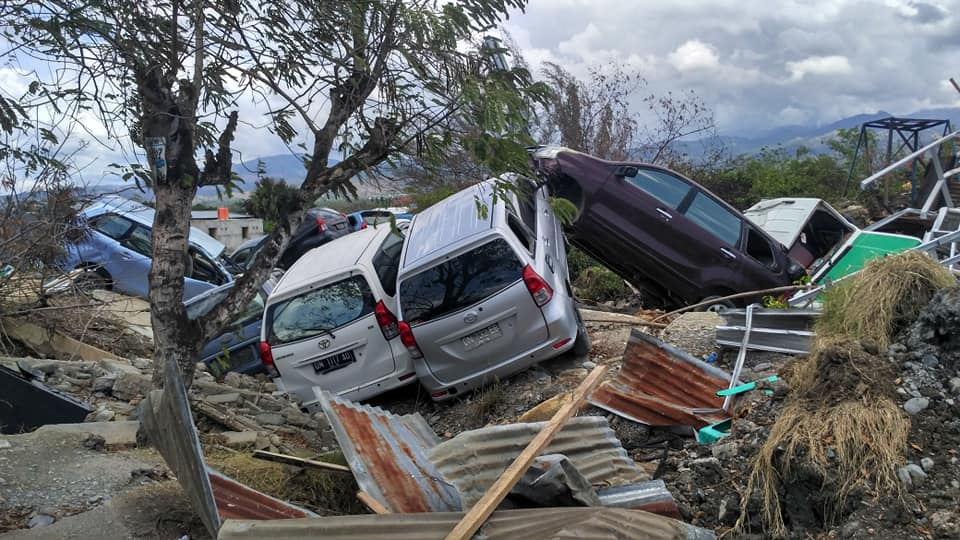

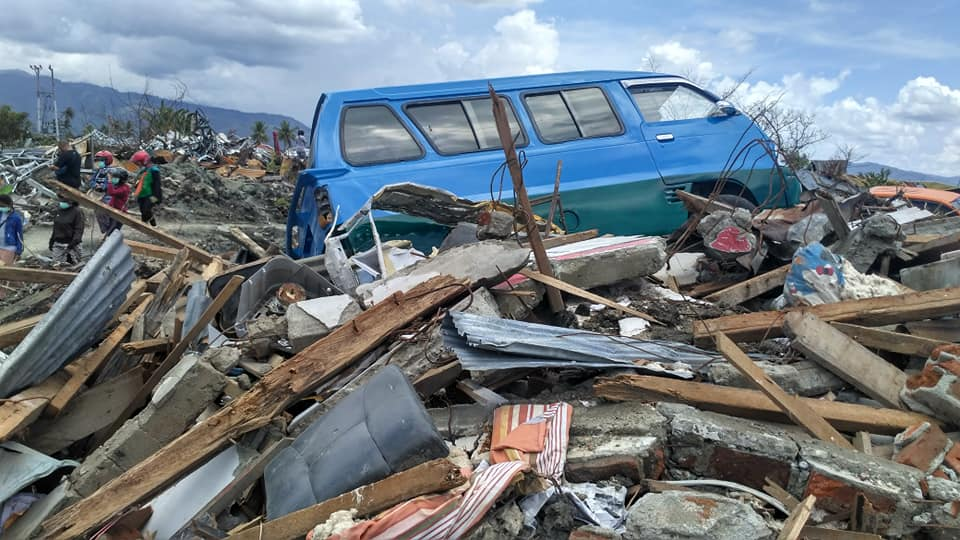
