= Habib =

- Pronunciation: [ħabiːb]
- Gender: Male

Origin
- Origin: Arabic
- Meaning: "Beloved" "Friend" (Maltese)

Other names
- Related names: Habiba

Habib (Arabic: حبيب, romanized: ḥabīb; Arabic pronunciation: [ħabiːb ]; also romanized as Habeeb) is an Arabic masculine given name, occasional surname, and honorific, with the meaning "beloved" or "my love", or "darling". It also forms the famous Arabic word "Habibi" which is used to refer to a friend or a significant other in the aspect of love or admiration. The name is popular throughout the Muslim World, though particularly in the Middle East and Africa. In other countries, especially in the Hadhramaut region of Yemen and Southeast Asian countries such as Brunei, Singapore, Indonesia and Malaysia, it is an honorific to address a Muslim scholar of Sayyid descent and where it is one of the names of the Islamic prophet Muhammad – حبيب الله Habib Allah (Habibullah/ Habiballah) - "Most Beloved of Allah (God)".

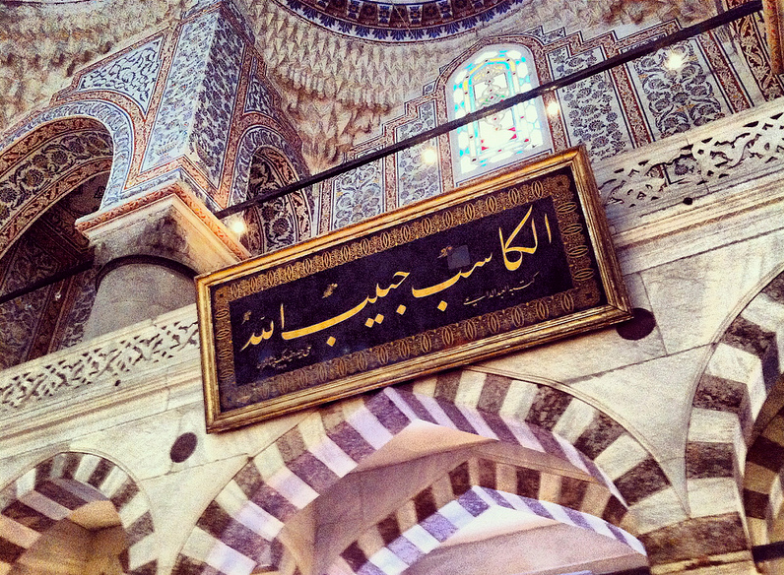
"The hard worker ("earner, gainer") is Most Loved of Allah" (Arabic: al-kāsib Ḥabīb Allah الكَسِب حَبِيب الله), atop an arch in a mosque in Istanbul, Turkey

The name, as is the case with other Arabic names, is not only confined to Muslims. Notable examples of Christian individuals named Habib include Habib the Deacon, Gabriel Habib and the Philosopher Habib. Habiba is the female equivalent. Notable people with the name include:

== Etymology ==
The name stems from the Arabic verb ḥabba (حَبَّ), meaning to "love", "admire, be fond of". Another variant which is used as a given name and adjective of the stem from that verb is "maḥbūb" (مَحْبُوب) meaning "well-beloved", commonly written as Mahbub, the female equivalent Mahbuba (Arabic: maḥbūbah مَحْبُوبَة). The Hebrew equivalent of the name is Haviv (Hebrew: חָבִיב) used as both a first name and last name with the same meaning, "darling" or "likeable" in Hebrew.

== Honorific title ==
- Habib Ali bin Abdurrahman Alhabshi (1870–1968), Indonesian cleric and preacher
- Habib Abu Bakr al-Aydarus (1447–1508), Hadhrami Muslim patron saint
- Habib Abdullah ibn Alawi al-Haddad (1634–1720), Yemeni Muslim patron saint
- Habib Alwi bin Thahir al-Haddad (1884–1962), mufti of Johor Bahru
- Habib Umar bin Hafiz (born 1963), Yemeni Sufi scholar
- Habib Ali al-Jifri (born 1971), Yemeni Islamic scholar
- Habib Munzir Al-Musawa (1973–2013), Indonesian Islamic cleric
- Habib Muhammad bin Ali bin Yahya (1844–1947), Mufti of Kutai
- Habib Muhammad Luthfi bin Yahya (born 1947), Indonesian Islamic cleric
- Habib Uthman bin Yahya (1822–1913), mufti of Batavia

== Given name ==
=== Habib ===
- Habib the Carpenter (5–35), Arab Islamic martyr
- Habib The Deacon, Syriac Christian martyr
- Habib (actor) (1940–2016), Pakistani film actor
- Habib (singer) (1947–2016), Iranian pop singer and songwriter
- Habib Far Abbasi (born 1997), Iranian footballer
- Habib Abdullayev (1912–1962), Soviet-Uzbek geologist and politician
- Habib Abela, Maltese diplomat
- Habib Achour (1913–1999), Tunisian trade unionist
- Habib Ademi (born 1970), Kosovan basketball player and coach
- Habib el-Adly (born 1938), Egyptian politician
- Habib Afkari (born 1991), Iranian political prisoner
- Habib Aghajari (born 1953), Iranian politician
- Habib Ahmad, Pakistani scientist
- Habib Ahmadzadeh (born 1963), Iranian author, novelist, and scriptwriter
- Habib al-Ajami (died 738), Iranian Muslim Sufi mystic, saint, and traditionalist
- Habib Akdaş (died 2004), Turkish terrorist
- Habib Ben Ali (1941–1996), Tunisian criminal
- Habib Fida Ali (1935–2017), Pakistani architect
- Habib Ammar (born 1946), Tunisian handball player
- Habib ibn Zayd al-Ansari, Arab sahaba and martyr of Islam
- Habib Ayrout (1876–1956), Egyptian architect
- Habib Ayyoub (born 1947), Algerian writer, journalist, and filmmaker
- Habib Azar (born 1979), American film, theater, and television director
- Habib Ben Azzabi (born 1937), Tunisian modern pentathlete
- Habib Bâ, Senegalese footballer and manager
- Habib Bacha (1931–1999), Lebanese Melkite Archbishop
- Habib Baghaei (born 1950), Iranian Brigadier General
- Habib ibn Bahriz, Abbasid bishop and scholar of the Church of the East
- Habib Baldé (born 1985), French-Guinean footballer
- Habib Jalib Baloch (1959–2010), Pakistani politician and judge
- Habib Bamogo (born 1982), French-Burkinabe footballer
- Habib Bektaş (born 1951), German-Turkish writer
- Habib Belk (born 1989), Moroccan gnawa singer, audio engineer, music producer, songwriter, and multi-instrumentalist
- Habib Bellaïd (born 1986), French-Algerian footballer
- Habib Benglia (1895–1960), French-Algerian film actor
- Habib Benmimoun (1957–2024), Algerian football player and coach
- Habib Beye (born 1977), French-Senegalese footballer
- Habib Borjian, Iranian linguist
- Habib Boukhreis, Western Saharan politician
- Habib Boularès (1933–2014), Tunisian diplomat and politician
- Habib Bourguiba (1903–2000), Tunisian politician
- Habib Bourguiba Jr. (1927–2009), Tunisian diplomat
- Habib Meftah Boushehri (born 1978), Iranian musician
- Habib Chaab (1973–2023), Iranian Arab political activist
- Habib Chamieh (born 1966), Lebanese Maronite Catholic bishop
- Habib Chatty (1916–1991), Tunisian politician and diplomat
- Habib Cheikhrouhou (1914–1994), Tunisian journalist
- Habib Choudhury (1916–1968), Indian cricket umpire
- Habib Dallagi (born 1941), Tunisian sports shooter
- Habib Boromand Dashghapu (1961–2025), Iranian Shiite cleric and politician
- Habib Davanloo (1927–2023), Canadian psychoanalyst and psychiatric researcher
- Habib Dehghani (born 1983), Iranian footballer
- Habib Dembélé (born 1962), Malian actor, director, and author
- Habib Diallo (born 1995), Senegalese professional footballer
- Habib Diarra (born 2004), French-Senegalese footballer
- Habib Dlimi (born 1950), Tunisian wrestler
- Habib Draoua (1914–2008), Algerian footballer
- Habib Elghanian (1912–1979), Iranian Jewish businessman and philanthropist
- Habib Esfahani (1835–1983), Iranian poet, grammarian and translator
- Habib Essid (born 1949), Tunisian politician
- Habib Faisal, Indian filmmaker and lyricist
- Habib Al Fardan (born 1990), Emirati footballer
- Habib Fatahi (born 1948), Iranian wrestler
- Habib Faye (1965–2018), Senegalese musician
- Habib ibn Abd al-Rahman al-Fihri (died 757), Arab noble of the Oqbid or Fihrid family
- Habib ibn Abi Ubayda al-Fihri (died 741), Arab military commander of the Fihrid family
- Habib ibn Maslama al-Fihri (617–662), 7th-century Arab general
- Habib Omar Fofana (born 1998), Ivorian footballer
- Habib Galhia (1941–2011), Tunisian boxer
- Habib Girgis (1876–1951), Egyptian Dean and Coptic Saint
- Habib Gordani (born 1983), Iranian footballer
- Habib Gorgi (1892–1965), Egyptian sculptor
- Habib Guèye (born 1999), French footballer
- Habib Habibou (born 1987), French footballer
- Habib Haddad (born 1980), Lebanese entrepreneur and investor
- Habib Chawki Hamraoui (born 1962), Algerian politician and journalist
- Habib Haroon (born 2000), Bahraini footballer
- Habib Hasanov (1922–2004), Azerbaijani politician
- Habib Iddrisu, Ghanaian politician
- Habib Jafar (born 1966), Iraqi footballer
- Habib Jalib (1928–1993), Pakistani poet and left-wing political activist
- Habib Jemli (born 1959), Tunisian politician
- Habib Kambanga (born 1968), Tanzanian politician
- Habib Kashani (born 1955), Iranian businessman
- Habib Kavuma (born 1991), Ugandan footballer
- Habib Keïta (born 2002), Malian footballer
- Habib Khabiri (1954–1984), Iranian footballer
- Habib Khan (born 1937), Indian cricketer
- Habib Kheder (born 1954), Tunisian handball player
- Habib Ali Kiddie (1929–1987), Pakistani field hockey player
- Habib Koité (born 1958), Senegalese-born Malian musician
- Habib Lakhal (born 1961), Tunisian wrestler
- Habib Levy (1896–1984), Iranian Jewish historian
- Habib Maïga (born 1996), Ivorian footballer
- Habib Majeri (born 1951), Tunisian footballer
- Habib Malik (born 1954), Lebanese-American historian
- Habib El Malki (born 1946), Moroccan politician
- Habib Mangal (born 1946), Afghan politician
- Habib Mazini (born 1954), Moroccan academic and writer
- Habib Miyan (died 2008), Indian longevity claimant
- Habib Mohamed (footballer, born 1983) (born 1983), Ghanaian footballer
- Habib Wali Mohammad (1921–2014), Pakistani ghazal and film playback singer
- Habib Mohammed (footballer, born 1997) (born 1997), Ghanaian footballer
- Habib Mousa (born 1952), Syrian musician
- Habib ibn al-Muhallab (died 720), Umayyad provincial governor and military commander
- Habib ibn Muzahir (605–680), Arab companion of Ali
- Habib Nasib Nader (born 1979), British actor
- Habib Nafisi (1908–1984), Iranian academic
- Habib Nasution (born 1936), Indonesian swimmer
- Habib Al-Naufali (born 1960), Iraqi Chaldean Catholic hierarch
- Habib Noh (1788–1866), Arab mystic
- Habib Oueslati (born 1997), French-Tunisian footballer
- Habib Painter (1915–1987), Indian Qawwal and a folk singer
- Habib Qahwaji (1932–2023), Palestinian teacher, writer and political activist
- Habib ibn Abd al-Malik al-Qurashi (730–778), Umayyad prince and commander in al-Andalus
- Habib Rahiab, American human rights lawyer
- Habib Rahimtoola (1912–1991), Pakistani politician and diplomat
- Habib Rahman (architect) (1915–1995), Indian architect
- Habib Reda (1919–2013), Algerian actor, musician, and composer
- Habib Ben Romdhane (born 1970), Tunisian football coach and player
- Habib Saad (born 1968), Ghanaian politician
- Habib Pacha Saad (1867–1942), Lebanese Maronite politician
- Habib Sabet (1903–1993), Iranian businessman
- Habib Sadegh, Tunisian football manager
- Habib Sadek (1930/31–2023), Lebanese poet, writer, and politician
- Habib Saher (1903–1988), Azerbaijani poet, writer, translator, and literary researcher
- Habib Abou Sakr, Lebanese Maronite academic
- Habib de las Salas (born 1987), Colombian Olympic weightlifter
- Habib Salih (1853–1936), Kenyan Islamic scholar
- Habib Bey Salimov (1881–1920), Azerbaijani army officer
- Habib Samaei (1905–1946) Iranian musician
- Habib Sangaré (born 1969), Malian footballer
- Habib Abdulrab Sarori (born 1956), Yemeni computer scientist and novelist
- Habib Sayah (born 1950), Algerian novelist
- Habib Al Sayegh (1955–2019), Emirati poet and writer
- Habib Selmi (born 1951), Tunisian novelist and short story writer
- Habib Abu Shahla (1902–1957), Lebanese politician and public figure
- Habib Sharifi, Iranian footballer
- Habib Shartouni (born 1958), Lebanese militant and assassin
- Habib Sissoko (born 1971), French footballer
- Habib Sissoko (judoka) (born 1959), Malian judoka
- Habib Souaidia (born 1969), Algerian writer
- Habib Suharko (1928–??), Indonesian swimmer
- Habib Sy, Senegalese politician
- Habib Sylla (born 1999), Ivorian footballer
- Habib Tajmiri (born 1986), Iranian film and television actor
- Habib Tanvir (1923–2009), Indian Urdu playwright, theatre director, poet, and actor
- Habib Tawa (born 1945), Lebanese-French historian, journalist, and mathematician
- Habib Tengour (born 1947), French-Algerian poet, sociologist, and anthropologist
- Habib Thiam (1933–2017), Senegalese politician
- Habib Touhami (1948–2026), Tunisian politician
- Habib Hassan Touma (1934–1998), Palestinian composer and ethnomusicologist
- Habib Wahid (born 1979), Bangladeshi composer and musician
- Habib Al-Wotayan (born 1996), Saudi footballer
- Habib Ben Yahia (born 1938), Tunisian politician
- Habib Younes (born 1959), Lebanese poet, journalist, political writer, and professor
- Habib Yunich (1906–1945), Chinese Tatar educator, journalist, and politician
- Habib Zabalawi, Jordanian journalist
- Habib Zargarpour (born 1964), Iranian art director

=== Habeeb ===
- Habeeb Ahmed (born 1987), Indian first-class cricketer
- Habeeb Ogunneye (born 2005), English footballer
- Habeeb Salloum (1924–2019), Arab-Canadian freelance writer

== Surname ==
- Aftab Habib (born 1972), English cricket player
- Anwara Habib (1928–2018), Bangladeshi politician
- Arif Habib (born 1953), Pakistani businessman
- Brian Habib (born 1964), American football player
- Cyrus Habib (born 1981), American Jesuit, politician
- Dina Powell née Habib (born 1973), Egyptian-born American government official
- Huzama Habayeb (born 1965), Palestinian novelist, columnist and translator
- Irfan Habib (born 1931), Indian historian
- Jawed Habib (born 1963), Indian hairstylist and businessman
- Juliana Habib (born 2000), Colombian beauty pageant contestant
- Mamdouh Habib (born 1955), Australian-Egyptian once held at Guantanamo Bay
- Meyer Habib (born 1961), French politician
- Naomi Habib, Israeli neuroscientist
- Philip Habib (1920–1992), American diplomat
- Rafik Habib (born 1959), Egyptian researcher, activist, author, and politician
- Ralph Habib (1912–1969), French film director of Lebanese and Egyptian origin
- Thomas Halim Habib (born 1963), Egyptian Coptic Catholic bishop

== Fictional characters ==
- Habib Halal, character in Australian film Fat Pizza

== See also ==
- Habib Bank
- Habib ur Rahman (disambiguation)
- Habib Public School
- Habibi (disambiguation)
- Habibullah
- Khabib
