= Mahboba =

Mahboba or Mahbuba is a feminine given name of Arabic origin. Notable people with the name include:

== Given name ==
=== Mahboba ===
- Mahboba Hoqooqmal (1944–2020), Afghan politician during Karzai's presidency
- Mahbouba Seraj (born 1948), Afghan journalist and women's right activist

=== Mahbuba ===
- Mahbuba (1825–1840), an enslaved girl owned by Hermann, Fürst von Pückler-Muskau
- Mahbuba (singer), 9th-century slave entertainer in the Abbasid Caliphate
- Mahbuba Farzana, Bangladeshi secretary of the Ministry of Information and Broadcasting
- Mahbuba Maqsoodi (born 1957), German-Afghan artist
- Mahbuba Nasreen (born 1963), Bangladeshi academic
- Mahbuba Rahman (1935–2026), Bangladeshi singer
- Mahbuba Islam Rakhi (born 1993), Bangladeshi Australian actress, model, and engineer

== See also ==
- Mehbooba (disambiguation), alternative spelling
- Mahboubeh, Iranian form of the given name
- Mahboob, masucline form of the Arabic given name
- Mahabubabad, a city in Telangana, India, named after Mahboob Ali Khan, the Nizam of Hyderabad
  - Mahabubabad (Assembly constituency)
  - Mahabubabad (Lok Sabha constituency)
- Mahbubnagar, a city in Telangana, India, also named after the Nizam
  - Mahabubnagar district
  - Mahbubnagar (Assembly constituency)
  - Mahbubnagar (Lok Sabha constituency)
