= Mahboob =

Mahbūb (also spelled Mahboob, or Mehboob, etc., from Arabic: مَحبُوب, passed to other languages such as Urdu: محبوب is a masculine given name and surname. Notable people with the name include:

== Given name ==
=== Mahboob ===
- Mahboob Alam (politician) (born 1968), Pakistani politician
- Maulana Mahboob Alam (1863–1933), founder of the daily Pakistani newspaper Paisa Akhbar
- Mahaboob Ben Ali (1927–2009), Indo-Trinidadian and Tobagonian American businessman
- Mahboob Ali Baig Sahib Bahadur, Indian politician
- Mahboob Hanifi (born 1997), Afghan footballer
- Mahboob Qirvanian (1894–??), Ottoman slave
- Mahboob Rahman Ruhel (born 1970), Bangladeshi politician
- Mahboob Shah (born 1938), Pakistani cricketer and Test cricket umpire
- Mahboob Meena Shah (1934–2020), Indian Sufi saint
- Mahboob Zahedi (1929–2006), Indian politician who represented the Katwa in West Bengal from 1996 to 2006

=== Mahbub ===
- Mahbub Ahmed, Bangladeshi politician
- Mahbub Uddin Ahmed, Bangladeshi veteran
- Mahbub Ali Khan, Asaf Jah VI (1866–1911), the 6th Nizam of Hyderabad Deccan
- Mahbub Ali Khan (1934–1984), Bangladeshi Chief of Naval Staff
- Mahbub Anam (1931–2001), Bangladeshi journalist and writer
- Mahbub Kabir Chowdhury, Bangladeshi politician
- Mahbubus Samad Chowdhury, Bangladeshi army general
- Mahbub Jamil, Bangladeshi businessman
- Mahbubul Karim (born 1986), Bangladeshi cricketer
- Mahbubul A Khalid, Bangladeshi poet, lyricist, and music composer
- Mahbub Uddin Khokon (born 1956), Bangladeshi politician
- Mahbubur Raschid, Bangladeshi banker
- Mahbubur Rob Sadi (1942–2016), Bangladeshi politician
- Mahbub Hassan Saleh, Bangladeshi diplomat
- Mahbub Talukdar (1942–2022), Bangladeshi poet, writer, and civil servant
- Mahbub Jamal Zahedi (1929–2008), establishing newspaper editor of Khaleej Times
- Mahbub Uz Zaman, Bangladeshi diplomat

=== Mehboob ===
- Mehboob (singer) (1926–1981), Indian playback singer of Malayalam films
- Mehboob Ali, multiple people
- Mehboob Bawa (born 1968), South African actor
- Mehboob Ullah Jan, Pakistani politician and social worker
- Mehboob Khan (1907–1964), Indian film director and producer
- Mehboob Khan (chef) (born 1969), Pakistani chef
- Mehboob Kotwal (born 1961), Indian songwriter
- Mehboob Khan Mirajkar (1868–1965), Indian tabla player
- Mehboob Nausheer (born 1934), Indian cricketer
- Mehboob Rahi, Indian poet
- Mehboob Shah, Pakistani politician
- Mehboob Sher, Pakistani politician

== Surname ==
=== Mahboob ===
- Ahmar Mahboob, teacher at the University of Sydney Department of Linguistics
- Ali Hasan Mahboob (born 1981), Bahraini long-distance runner
- Kazi Golam Mahboob (1927–2006), activist of the Language Movement that took place in the erstwhile East Pakistan
- Shahid Mahboob (born 1962), Pakistani cricketer

=== Mehboob ===
- Farhan Mehboob (born 1988), Pakistani squash player
- Waqar Mehboob (born 1991), Pakistani squash player

== See also ==
Places

- Mahboob Mansion, palace, named after Mahbub Ali Khan, Asaf Jah VI, the VIth Nizam, who lived here occasionally
- Mahbubnagar, a city in Andhra Pradesh, India
- Mahbubnagar district, a district in Andhra Pradesh, India
- Mahabubabad, a village in Andhra Pradesh, India

Arts and entertainment

- Mehboob Ki Mehndi, Hindi film
- Mere Mehboob, Indian film

Name

- Mahbubul Alam, multiple people
- Mahbubul Haq, multiple people
- Mahbubur Rahman, multiple people

Habib, and the female equivalent Habiba
