= Mehbooba =

Mehbooba may refer to

- Mehbooba (1976 film), an Indian Hindi-language film
- Mehbooba (2008 film), an Indian Hindi-language romance film
- Mehbooba (2018 film), an Indian Telugu-language film
- Mehbooba Mahnoor Chandni, Bangladeshi model, actress and dancer
- Mehbooba Mufti (born 1959), Indian politician

== See also ==
- Mahboba (disambiguation)
- "Mehbooba Mehbooba", a song by R. D. Burman from the 1975 Indian film Sholay
- Mahboob, masculine form of the Arabic given name
  - Mehboob (lyricist), an Indian lyricist
  - Mehboob (singer), an Indian singer
- Mahabubabad, a city in Telangana, India, named after Mahboob Ali Khan, the Nizam of Hyderabad
  - Mahabubabad (Assembly constituency)
  - Mahabubabad (Lok Sabha constituency)
- Mahbubnagar, a city in Telangana, India, also named after the Nizam
  - Mahabubnagar district
  - Mahbubnagar (Assembly constituency)
  - Mahbubnagar (Lok Sabha constituency)
