= Teacher-Student Centre, University of Dhaka =

Building in Dhaka, Bangladesh

Teacher-Student Centre
- ছাত্র-শিক্ষক কেন্দ্র
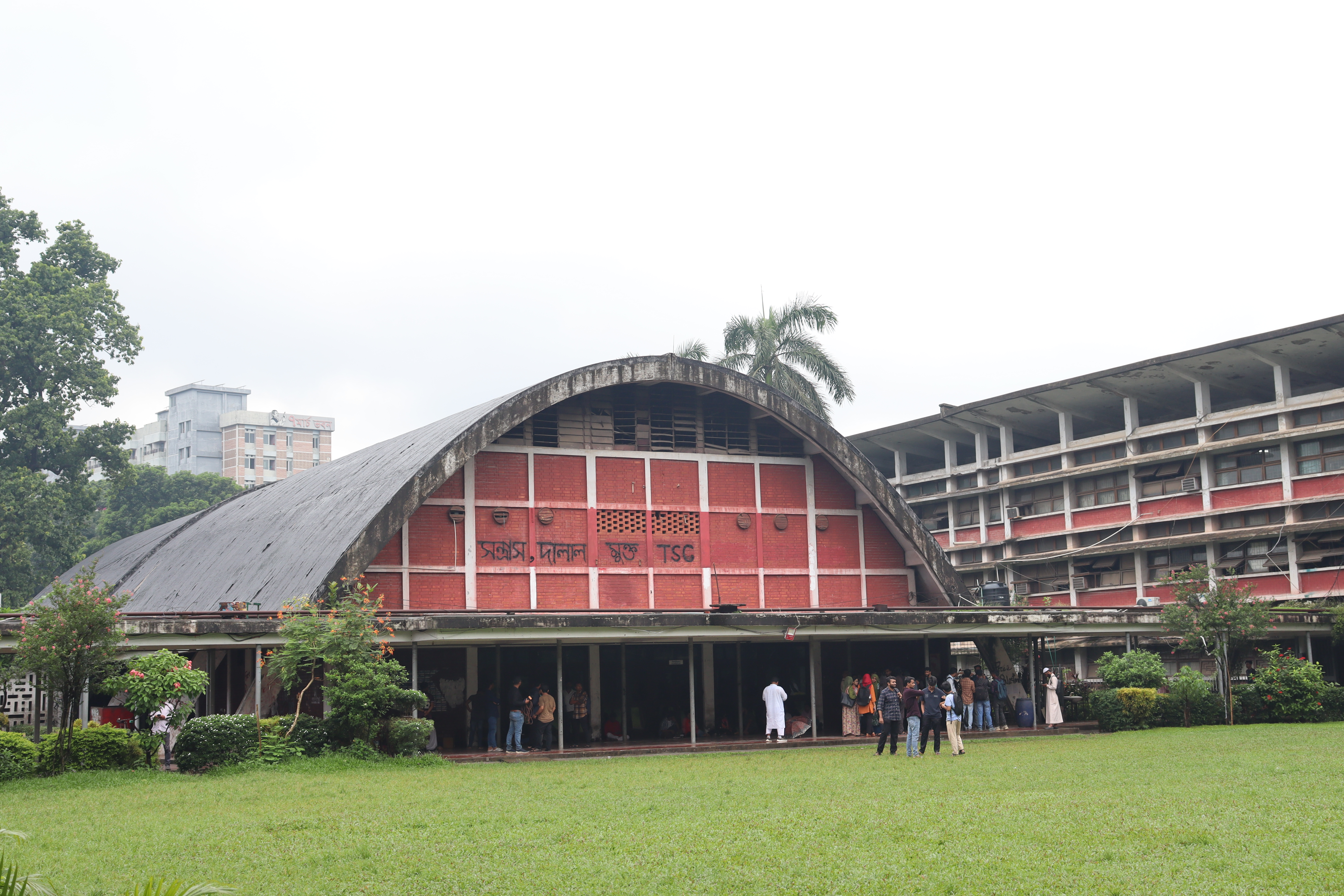
- Teacher-Student Centre in 2024
- Interactive map of the Teacher-Student Centre area
- Alternative names: TSC

General information
- Type: Recreational Centre
- Architectural style: Modern
- Location: Dhaka, Bangladesh, Dhaka
- Coordinates: 23.731229°N 90.3962°E
- Completed: 1961

Design and construction
- Architect: Constantinos Apostolou Doxiadis

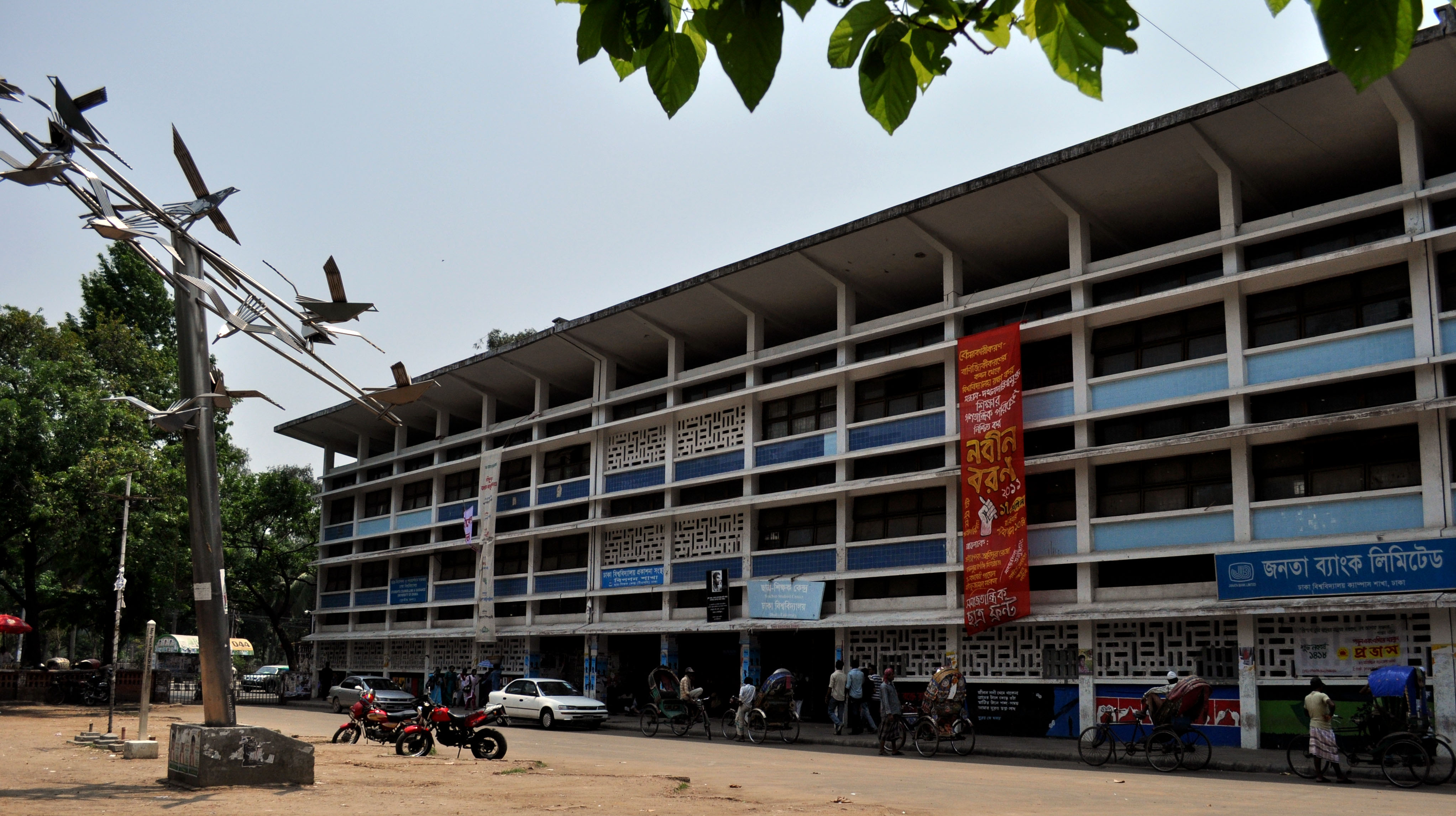
The front view of TSC

Teacher-Student Centre (Bengali: শিক্ষক-ছাত্র কেন্দ্র, romanized: Sikkhok-Chhatra Kendra), also known as TSC, is a building on the Dhaka University campus in Shahbagh, Dhaka, Bangladesh. The centre was established in 1961 by the Dhaka University by the Division of Public Affairs.

== History ==
The construction of the Teacher-Student Centre was financed by the Pakistan Government and the Ford foundation. Parts of the site used to be land of the old Sujatpur Palace grounds (the oldest Nawab Mansion in Shahbagh). There was a Greek cemetery on the west side of the race course, now Suhrawardy Udyan. Many historically important political meetings and discussions were held at the Teacher-Student Centre during the Bangladesh Liberation War.

== Architectural significance ==
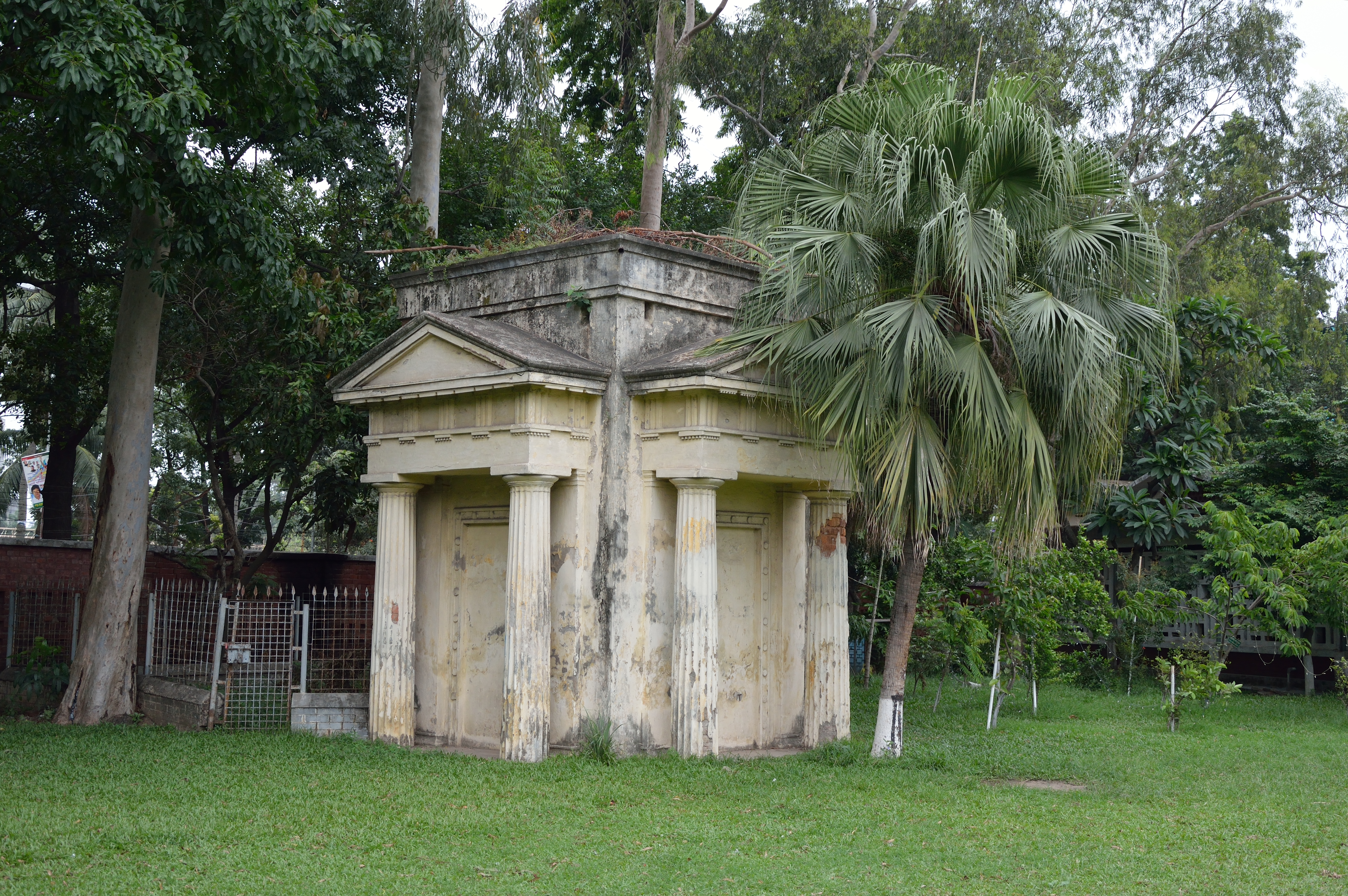
Greek Memorial - TSC Complex

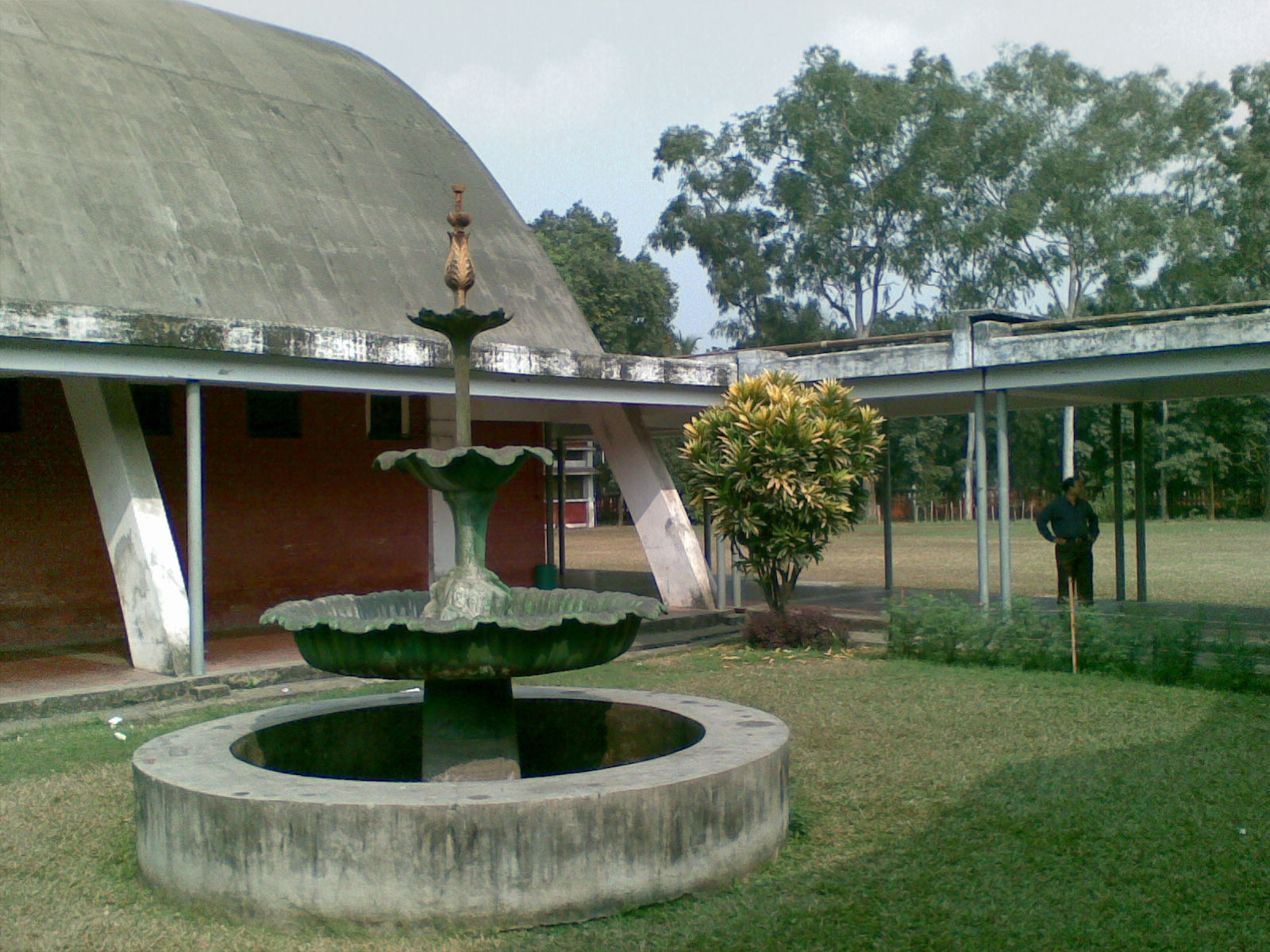
Fountain in TSC

The main building was designed by Konstantinos Apostolos Doxiadis An example of modern architecture, according to architect Mahbubur Rahman it takes into account indigenous culture, climate, and spatial arrangement. Arranged around a court, it has an extra butterfly canopy (double roof) extended over the main block at the front, which helps to keep the Centre cool. The complex contains dining rooms, meeting rooms, libraries, art and music rooms, stages, a multipurpose hall, game rooms, a film lab, rehearsal rooms, and more. As a result, the Teacher-Student Centre forms the social and cultural heart of the campus. The complex has some extensions which were built during the 1980s that allowed north–south cross-ventilation. As one enters the Teacher-Student Centre, a sculpture by Hamiduzzaman Khan greets the visitors.

Across the green lawn to the east of the Teacher-Student Centre stands a small Greek Mausoleum. It was constructed in 1915. This building has a square structure, similar to a classical doric monument, with an entrance on the east side, transforming the square plan into a cruciform shape. The flat roof projects forward on all sides. The mausoleum still has several epitaphs attached to the wall, most of which are written in classical Greek. It is the only trace of the small Greek community that existed in Bangladesh in the 19th century.

Inside the swimming pool enclave of the centre, two small Siva temples are housed, with a small monument between them. The swimming pool is currently not in use.

== Activities ==
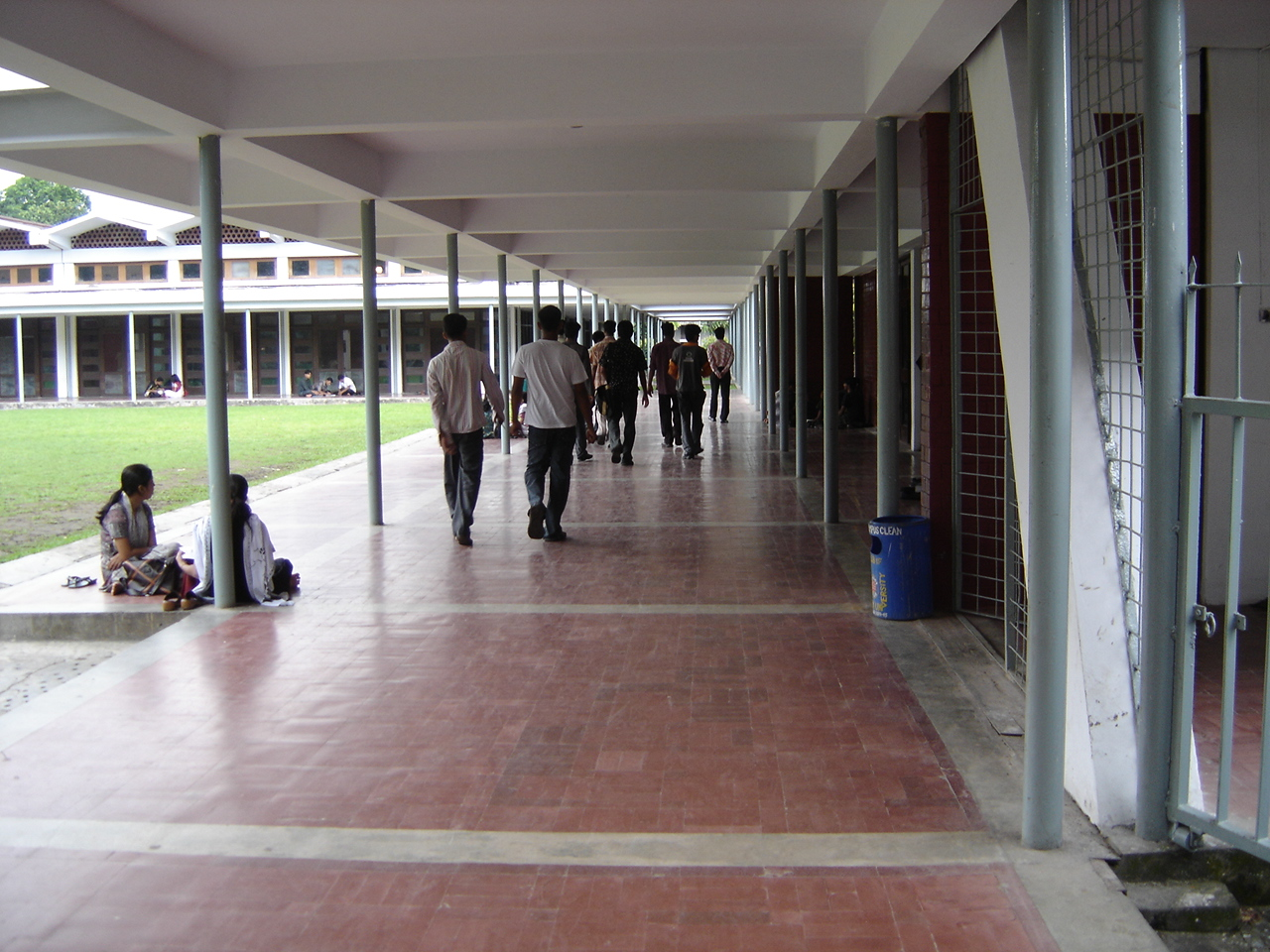
TSC Corridor

The Teacher-Student Centre seeks to foster campus community life to supplement the formal academic program of the university. Campus organizations hold their meetings, functions, lectures, and arts exhibitions in the building. Discussion sessions are frequently scheduled, journals and bulletins published, and competitions held, giving the university a varied programme of cultural and social events.

Student activities also include relief and aid, such as during the devastating flood of 1987 and Sidr in 2007. Students prepared food and saline for the flood victims for over four months. The Centre holds the facilities of a voluntary blood donation organization, called Badhan, organized by the students of the university.

The Centre houses the office of Badhan, Dhaka University Debating Society, Dhaka University Film Society, Dhaka University Quiz Society, Dhaka University Tourist Society, Dhaka University Journalists Association, Dhaka University Photographic Society, Dhaka University Chess Club, Dhaka University Model United Nations Association, Rover Scout and different socio-cultural groups of the students.

Dhaka University Publication Centre and Janata Bank are situated in the building.
