= Muhammad bin Yahya =

Habib Muhammad bin Yahya
- محمّد بن يحيى
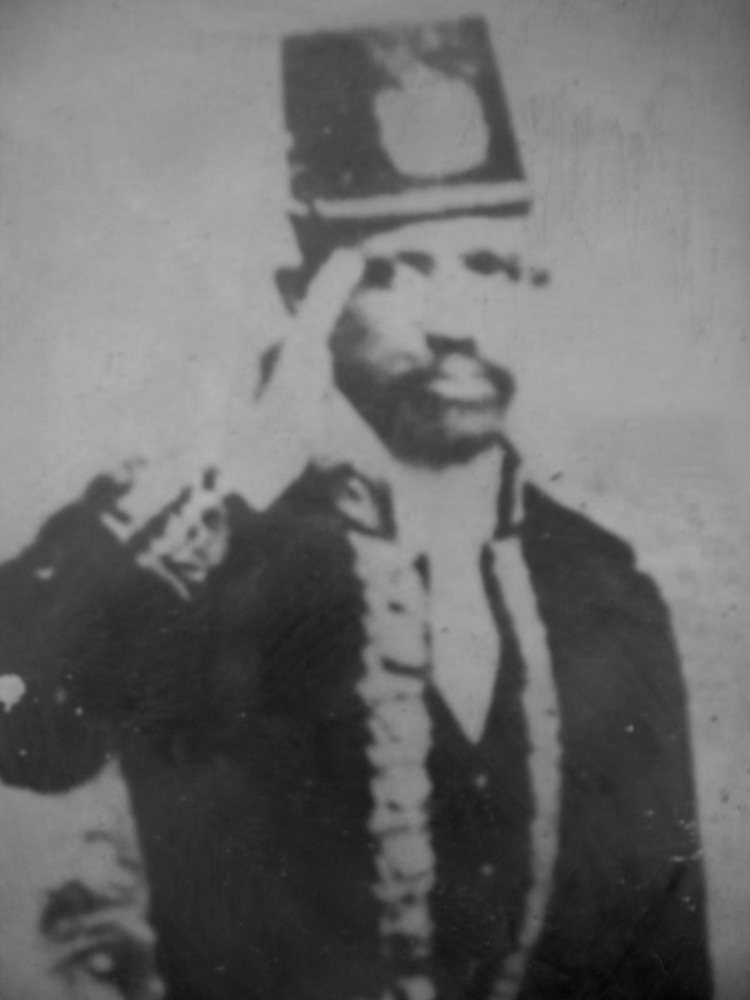
- Prince Noto Igomo
- Born: Muhammad; 1844 CE; Al-Masilah, Hadhramaut, South Arabia (Yemen in present day)
- Died: February 17, 1947 (aged 102–103); Tenggarong, Kutai
- Resting place: Makam Kelambu Kuning
- Other names: Habib Tenggarong
- Occupations: Islamic scholar, mufti
- Employer: Sultanate of Kutai
- Known for: Mufti of Kutai
- Title: Habib, Raden Syarif Penghulu, Pangeran Noto Igomo
- Spouse: Aji Aisyah gelar Aji Raden Resminingpuri
- Parent(s): Ali bin Yahya (father); Woman from the family of Bin Thahir (mother)
- Relatives: Aji Muhammad Alimuddin (father-in-law); Aji Muhammad Parikesit (brother-in-law)

Habib Muhammad bin Yahya (Arabic: محمّد بن يحيى, romanized: Muḥammad bin Yahyā; Arabic pronunciation: [(ʔ)mʊˈħæmmæd bin jɑħjɑ:] full name: (Arabic: سيد محمّد بن علي بن حسن بن طه بن يحيى العلوي, romanized: Sayyid Muḥammad bin ‘Alī bin Ḥasan bin Ṭāhā bin Yaḥyā al-‘Alawī); 1844 CE/1260 AH – February 17, 1947 CE/Rabi' al-awwal 26, 1366 AH) or better known as the title of Prince Noto Igomo was an Indonesian scholar from Hadhramaut who became the Grand Mufti of Kutai during the reign of Sultan Aji Muhammad Alimuddin (1899-1910).

== Biography ==
=== Early life ===
Habib Muhammad bin Yahya was born in 1260 AH (1844 CE) in Al-Masilah, a small village in Hadhramaut. Muhammad came from the family of Ba 'Alawi sada surnamed Aal bin Yahya, his father named Sayyid Ali bin Hasan bin Thaha bin Yahya (d. 1875), while his mother was a Sharifah from the family of bin Thahir. The father of his grandfather, Habib Thaha bin Muhammad bin Yahya was his ancestor who first entered Nusantara. He first entered Indonesia via Penang, Malaysia. In Penang, he met Sultan Hamengkubuwana II (1750–1828) who exiled by the Netherlands, who later became his disciple as well as his father-in-law.

=== Personal life ===
During his lifetime, Habib Muhammad bin Yahya was married to four women. First, he married in Tarim while traveling from Hadhramaut to Aden via Tarim, from which he had no offspring. Secondly, when traveling from Batavia to Surabaya he married a girl from Surabaya who gave him a daughter named Sharifah Fatimah. Third, he married in Ambon while traveling from Surabaya to Ambon to meet his cousin Habib Abdullah bin Ali bin Abdurrahman bin Thahir, from whom he had a son named Sayyid Ali. Fourth, he married in Tenggarong with Aji Aisyah gelar Aji Raden Resminingpuri, daughter of Aji Muhammad Alimuddin (19th Sultan of Kutai) and sister of Aji Muhammad Parikesit (20th Sultan of Kutai). From his marriage to Aji Aisyah, he was awarded 9 children, 6 men (Sayid Ahmad, Sayid Umar, Sayid Ali, Sayid Barri, Sayid Abdul Maula, and Sayid Hussein) and 3 women (Sharifah Sehhah, Sharifah Nur, and Sharifah Fatimah). Because of his marriage to the Kutai nobility, his descendants were later given the title Aji Sayid for men and Aji Syarifah for women. Adji Raden Sajid Fadly, an Indonesian actor from Samarinda is one of his descendants.

== Migrate to Indonesia ==
=== Journey from Hadhramaut ===
The thing behind the immigration of Habib Muhammad bin Yahya to Indonesia in addition to visiting his relatives in Batavia (now Jakarta) and Ambon who first migrated, also for trade and preach. The route from Al-Masilah, Hadhramaut to Indonesia there are two versions, first, from Masilah-Tarim-Aden-Batavia-Surabaya-Ambon-Tenggarong; second, from Masilah-Tarim-Aden-Batavia-Surabaya-Ambon-Surabaya-Tenggarong.

On his journey from Al-Masilah to Indonesia, Habib Muhammad passed Aden through Tarim. At Tarim, he's staying in a house where the owner is exposed to leprosy. By Allah's permission, the owner of the house affected by the leprosy was treated by him and healed. As gratitude, the homeowner then marry off his niece with Habib Muhammad. After surviving in Tarim for some time, Habib Muhammad then continued his journey to Aden until he reached Batavia.

In Batavia, he visited his maternal uncle, Habib Abu Bakar bin Thahir. After continuing his journey to Surabaya, in Boto Putih he studied religion to Habib Shaykh Bafaqih. In addition, he also met his cousin named Habib Abdullah bin Ali bin Abdurrahman bin Thahir who was in Ambon.

=== Arrival in Tenggarong ===
Habib Muhammad bin Yahya arrived at Tenggarong in 1877. In Tenggarong, he married the daughter of Sultan Aji Muhammad Alimuddin (19th Sultan of Kutai) named Aji Aisyah gelar Aji Raden Resminingpuri.

== Activity ==
=== Mufti of Kutai ===
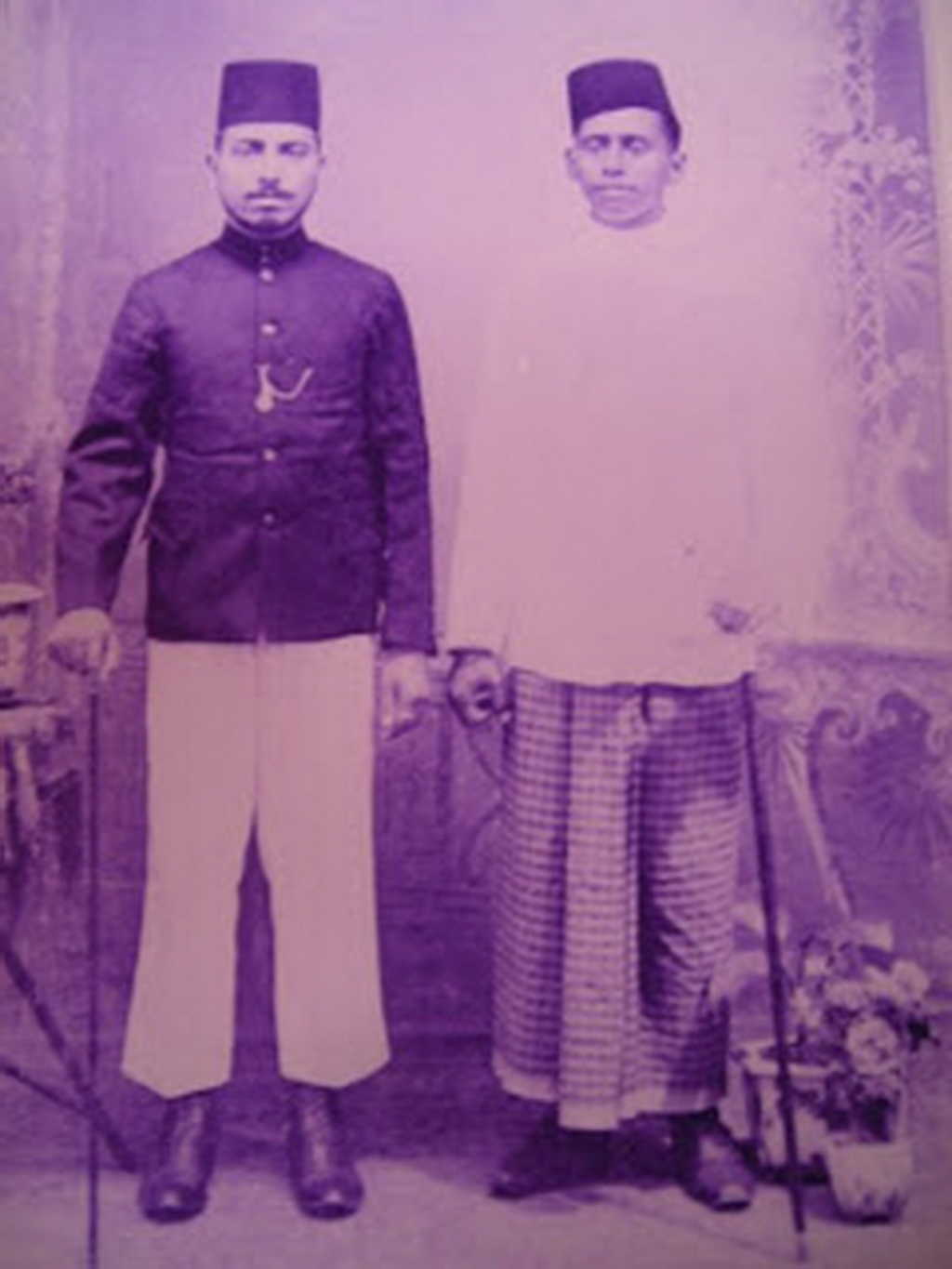
Habib Ali bin Abdullah al-Habsyi Barabai (left) and Habib Muhammad bin Yahya Tenggarong (right).

Sultan Aji Muhammad Alimuddin gave the position as the penghulu and mufti of the sultanate who had full authority to take care of all sultanate issues about religious to Habib Muhammad bin Yahya. He also obtained an honorary title from the Sultan with the title "Raden Syarif Penghulu", then was continued with the title of "Prince Noto Igomo". During his tenure, Prince Noto Igomo teaches Islam such as the laws of Sharia and Sufism to the people of Tenggarong and surrounding areas.

Together with the Islamic scholars, he encouraged the acceleration of Islamic preaching in Kalimantan. One of the da'wah colleagues who supported his "jihad" was Habib Alwi bin Abdullah al-Habsy, an Arab Captain in Barabai, South Kalimantan. Both are close friends while in Hadhramaut and reunited in the land of Borneo.

=== Other activities ===
In addition to taking care and teaching religion, he also paid attention to people's welfare issues by way of inviting people to work on plantations. Together with the community, he then opened a coconut plantation in Sangkulirang, East Kutai; rattan plantations in Sandaran, East Kutai; and rubber plantations in Bukit Jering, Muara Kaman, Kutai Kartanegara.

== Died ==
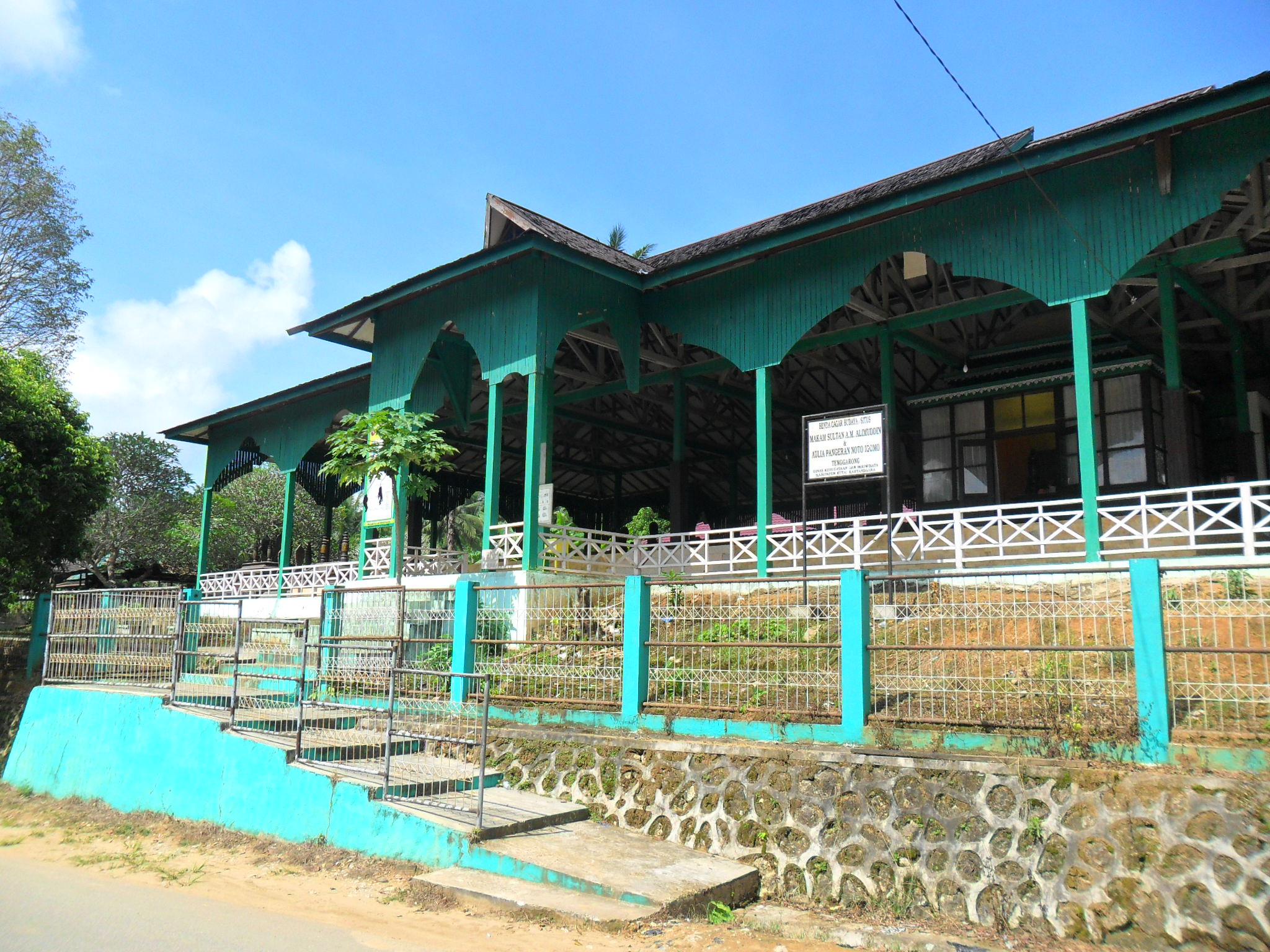
Sultan Aji Muhammad Alimuddin and Prince Noto Igomo tombs at Makam Kelambu Kuning.

On 26 Rabi' al-awwal 1366 AH or coinciding with 17 February 1947 CE, Habib Muhammad bin Yahya gelar Raden Syarif Prince Noto Igomo died. His corpse was buried in Makam Kelambu Kuning, Tenggarong, Kutai Kartanegara Regency, East Kalimantan. The restingplace was adjacent to the tomb of his wife and father-in-law, Sultan Aji Muhammad Alimuddin. Ceremonial to remember the death (haul) of Habib Muhammad bin Yahya was always commemorated every year in Hasanuddin Mosque, Tenggarong.
