= International Day for Disaster Risk Reduction =

Annual UN observance on October 13

- Date: October 13
- Next time: October 13, 2026
- Frequency: Annual

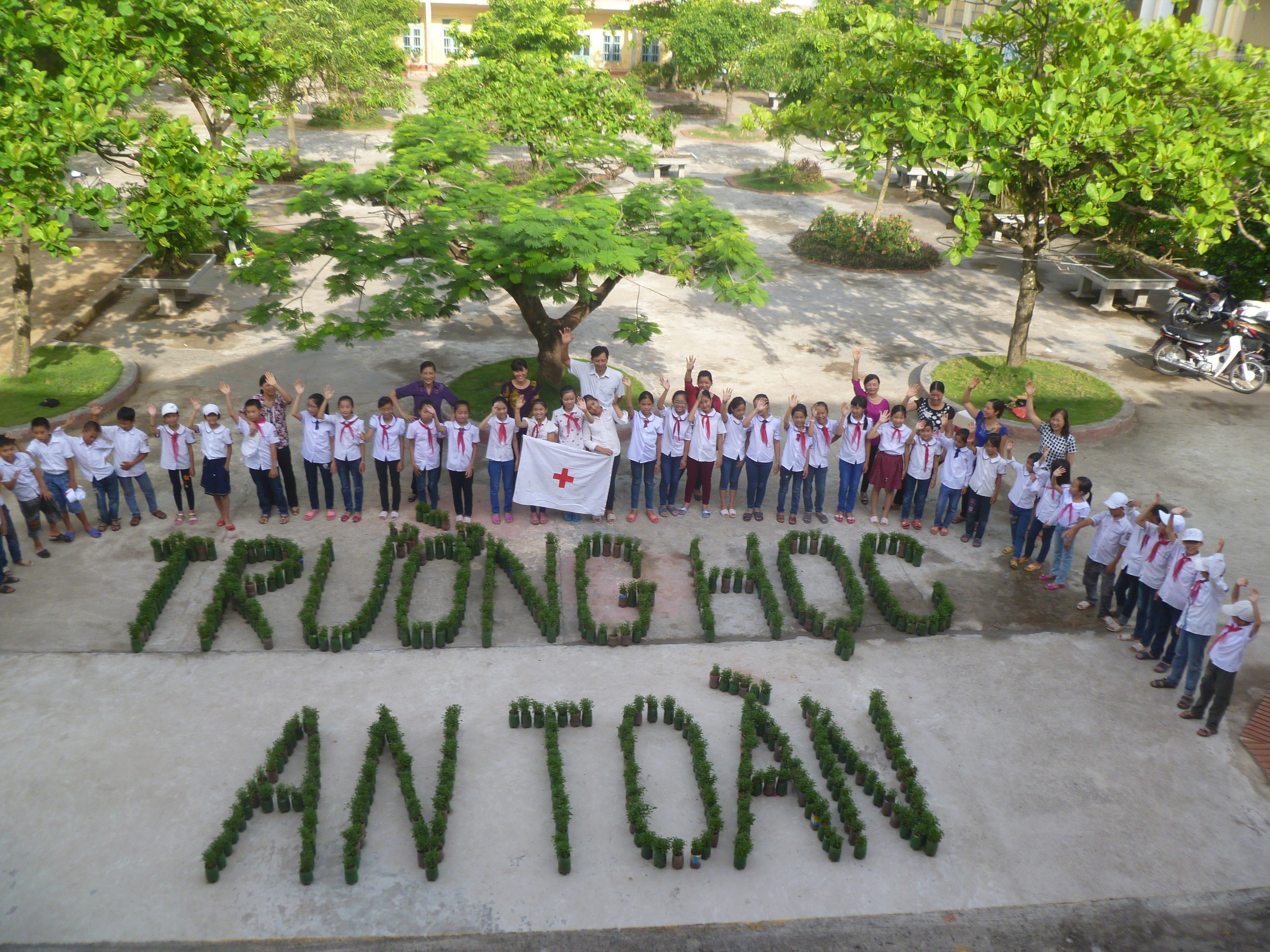
USAID supports school disaster risk reduction day in Nam Dinh

International Day for Disaster Risk Reduction (IDDRR) is an international day that encourages every citizen and government to take part in building more disaster-resilient communities and nations. The United Nations General Assembly designated October 13 as International Day for Natural Disaster Reduction as part of its proclamation of International Decade for Natural Disaster Reduction.

In 2002, by a further resolution, the General Assembly decided to maintain the annual observance as a vehicle to promote a global culture of natural disaster reduction, including prevention, mitigation, and preparedness.

In 2009, the UN General Assembly decided to designate October 13 as the official date for this day, and also changed the name to International Day for Disaster Reduction. The word risk was added to the name later.

The day can provide an opportunity for the media to highlight the subject of disaster recovery planning. In 2023 The Daily Star in Bangladesh included a relevant article on 13 October. It was written by Professor Mahbuba Nasreen who leads the Institute of Disaster Management and Vulnerability Studies (IDMVS) at the University of Dhaka. She discussed the need for an all inclusive approach given the theme for that year of "Fighting Inequality for a Resilient Future."

== See also ==
- World Conference on Disaster Risk Reduction
