= Mahbubul Alam =

Mahbubul Alam (Arabic: محبوب العالم), also rendered Mahbub Alam, is a Muslim masculine given name of Arabic origin. It may refer to:

- Mehboob-ul-Alam Hamza Makhdoom (1494–1576), Kashmiri Sufi mystic
- Mahbub Alam (journalist) (1863–1933), Indian journalist and publisher
- Mahbubul Alam (writer) (1898–1981), Bangladeshi author
- Mahbub Ul Alam Choudhury (1927–2007), Bangladeshi poet and language activist
- Mahbub Alam Chashi (1927–1983), Bangladeshi public official and social worker
- Mahbubul Alam (journalist) (1936–2014), Bangladeshi journalist and adviser to the government
- Mahbubul Alam Tara (1939–2014), Bangladeshi entrepreneur and politician
- Mehboob Alam (actor) (1948–1994), Pakistani actor
- Mahbubey Alam (1949–2020), designated senior counsel and Attorney General of Bangladesh
- Mahbubul Alam (politician), Bangladeshi politician
- Mahbub Alam (politician) (born 1956), Indian politician
- Mahbubul Alam Hanif (born 1959), Bangladeshi politician
- Mahboob Alam (politician) (born 1968), Pakistani politician
- Mohamed Mahbub Alam (1975–2010), Bangladeshi sprinter
- Mehboob Alam Khan, Hyderabadi cook
- Mahbub Alam Pollab (born 1978), Bangladeshi-Korean actor
- Mehboob Alam (cricketer) (born 1981), Nepalese cricketer
- Mahbubul Alam (cricketer) (born 1983), Bangladeshi cricketer
- Mahbubul Alam Anik (born 1996), Bangladeshi cricketer
- Md Mahbubul Alam, Bangladeshi politician
- Md Mahbub Alam, Bangladeh Army general
- Mahbubul Alam (businessman)

== See also ==
- Mahbub
- Alam
