= Munzir Al-Musawa =

Habib Munzir Al-Musawa
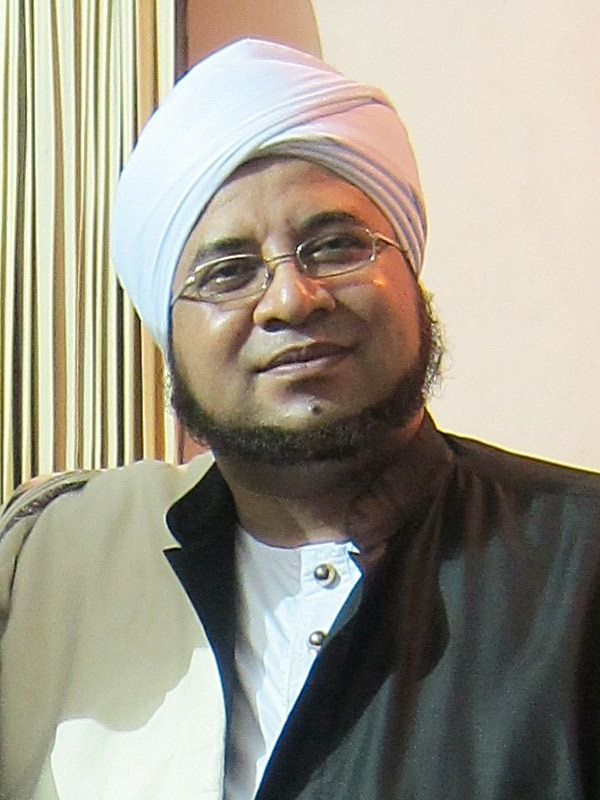
- Born: February 23, 1973; Cipanas, West Java, Indonesia
- Died: September 15, 2013 (aged 40); Jakarta
- Resting place: Jakarta
- Citizenship: Indonesian
- Years active: 1998–2013
- Organization: Majelis Rasulullah
- Title: Habib
- Spouse: Khadijah Al-Juneid
- Children: Muhammad; Hasan; Fatimah
- Parent(s): Fuad bin Abdurrahman (father), Rahmah binti Hasyim (mother)
- Relatives: Nabil, Ramzi, Lulu, Lia
- Website: www.majelisrasulullah.org

Habib Munzir bin Fuad Al-Musawa (Arabic: منذر المساوى Munḏir Al-Musāwā; February 23, 1973 – September 15, 2013) was an Indonesian Islamic cleric, teacher, da'i and founder of the Majelis Rasulullah religious organization.

== Early life ==
Munzir was born on February 23, 1973, in Cipanas, Indonesia, the fourth of five children. His father, Fuad Bin Abdurrahman Al-Musawa, was born in Palembang and was a journalist for the Berita Buana newspaper. His mother, Rahmah Binti Hashim Al-Musawa, was also born in Palembang. His father spent ten years in Mecca studying with Alawi Al-Maliki, father of Muhammad Bin Alawi al-Maliki, at the Masjidil Haram. He also received a Bachelor of Science in Electrical Engineering from New York University and had some training in journalism from Academy of Political Sciences in New York. Fuad bin Abdurrahman Al-Musawa died in 1996 in Cipanas, Indonesia.

Most of Munzir's childhood was spent in Cipanas with his siblings Nabiel, Ramzy, Lulu, and Aliyah. Munzir is a sayyid, a descendant of Muhammad in the Ba 'Alawi sada family through his grandson Hussein ibn Ali.

== Education ==
After high school, Munzir began studying sharia in the ma'had assaqafah of Al-Habib Abdurrahman Assegaf in Bukit Duri, South Jakarta and studied Arabic at LPBA Assalafy. He continued his education in Islamic legal studies at Al Khairat Ma'had in Bekasi, led by Habib Naqib bin Muhammad bin shaykh Abubakar bin Salim. At ma'had Al-Khayrat he became acquainted with Habib Umar bin Hafiz, director and founder of Dar al-Mustafa boarding school in Tarim, Yemen, who visited the school as part of his outreach. In 1994, Munzir received a four-year scholarship to study sharia at the school. He studied fiqh, Qur'anic tafsir, hadith, tawhid, tasawwuf, dawah and other Islamic subjects.

== Career ==
After four years at the Dar al-Mustafa Islamic seminary, Munzir returned to Indonesia in 1998 to begin an unsuccessful missionary program in Cipanas. He then began preaching in Jakarta, living in his students' houses. The assembly met on Tuesday night evenings in the homes of his followers, who were primarily older laymen.

When the congregation grew too large to meet in private homes, they began meeting in mosques. When one mosque became too small the worshipers moved to a larger one until they established a permanent mosque, Al-Munawwar.

== Legacy ==
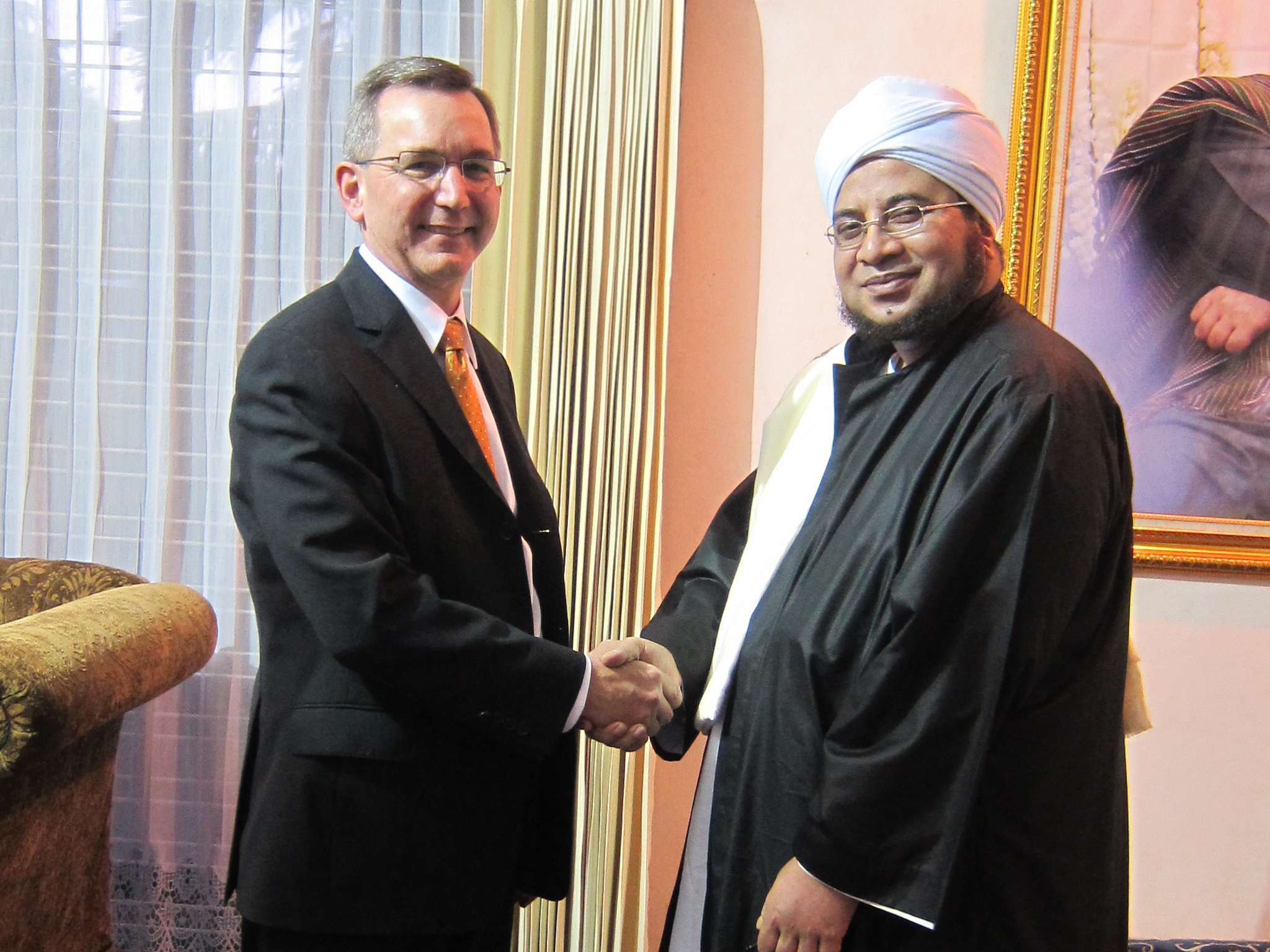
U.S. ambassador to Indonesia Scot Marciel met with Habib Munzir bin Fuad al-Musawa at the cleric’s residence on January 9, 2013.

Munzir founded Majelis Rasulullah, which continues to meet weekly, to teach people that Islam is a religion of peace and love. He said that the organization is for people (especially youth) in crowded cities such as Jakarta who want to find inner peace and turn away from violence, anarchy and drugs. Many of his followers are former drug addicts, alcoholics and criminals who have become devout Muslims because of Munzir. On January 9, 2013, U.S. ambassador to Indonesia Scot Marciel visited Munzir to discuss the importance of religious tolerance, spirituality, mutual understanding and interfaith dialogue in both countries.

== Family ==
Munzir was married to Khadijah Al-Juneid, with whom he had three children: two sons, Muhammad and Hasan, and a daughter, Fatimah.

== Death ==
Munzir wrote in a blog that Muhammad appeared to him in a dream and told him he would die at age 40. Munzir died from complications of asthma and encephalitis on September 15, 2013, at age 40 and was buried in Jakarta's Habib Kuncung cemetery. Thousands of people, including ulama, artists and Indonesian officials, attended his funeral and Indonesian president Susilo Bambang Yudhoyono delivered a eulogy.
