= International Decade for Natural Disaster Reduction =

The United Nations General Assembly designated the 1990s as the International Decade for Natural Disaster Reduction (IDNDR).

Its basic objective was to decrease the loss of life, property destruction and social and economic disruption caused by natural disasters, such as earthquakes, tsunamis, floods, landslides, volcanic eruptions, droughts, locust infestations, and other disasters of natural origin.

== History ==
On December 22, 1989, the United Nations General Assembly passed Resolution 44/236, officially launching The International Decade for Natural Disaster Reduction.

From 1990 to 1999, the effort was intended to reduce, through concerted international action, especially in developing countries, loss of life, property damage and social and economic disruption caused by natural disasters. To support the decade's activities, a Secretariat was established at the United Nations Office in Geneva, in close association with UNDRO.

== See also ==
- International Day for Disaster Reduction
- World Conference on Disaster Reduction
- Disaster management
