= Greek Memorial, Dhaka =

Monument in Dhaka, Bangladesh

Greek Memorial
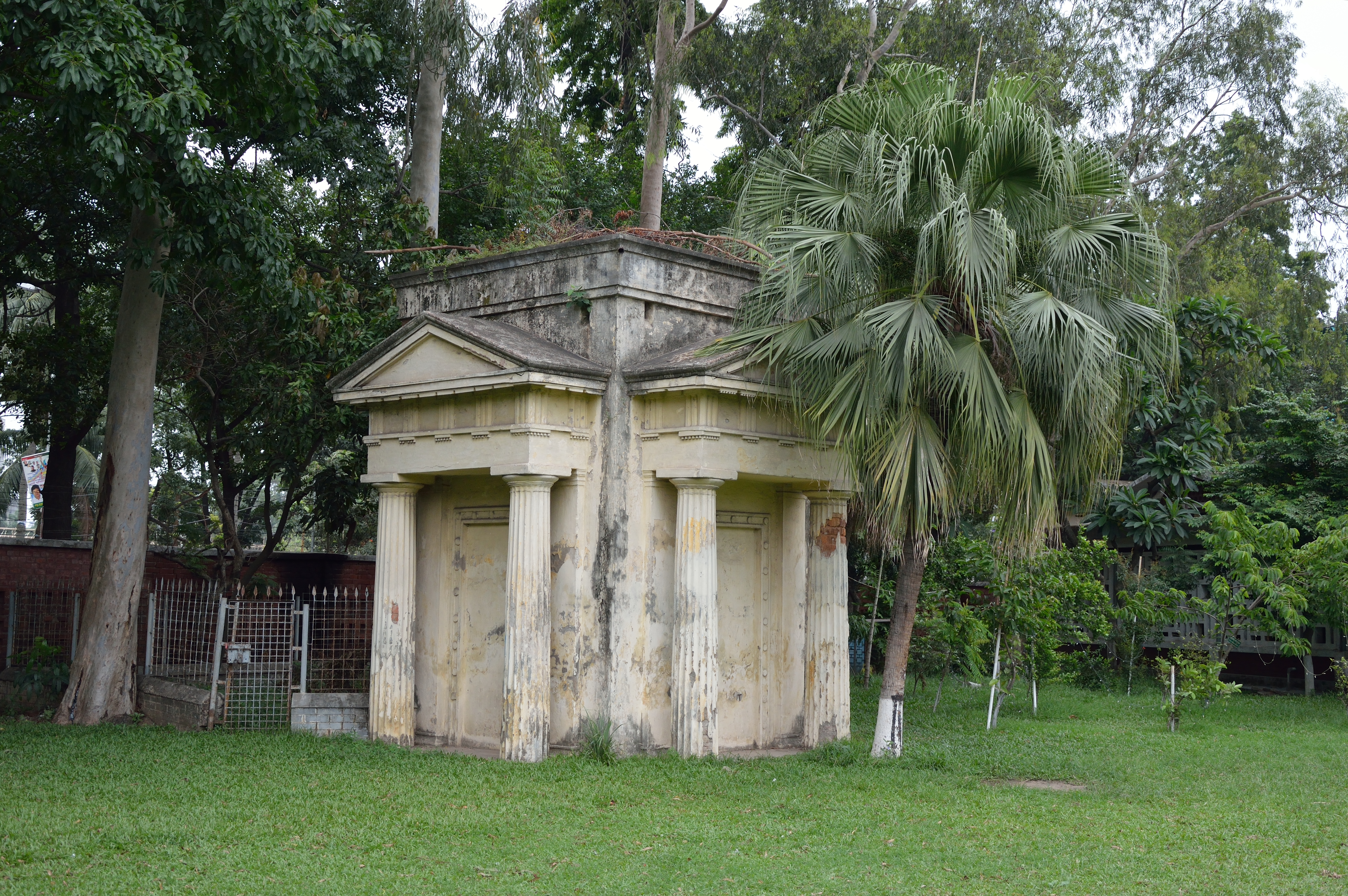
- Greek Memorial in TSC Complex, University of Dhaka
- Interactive map of Greek Memorial
- Location: TSC (Teacher-Student Centre) of University of Dhaka
- Coordinates: 23.7318°N 90.3963°E

Greeks were the last among European merchants to come to Bangladesh. They came to Bangladesh around the 18th century. They constructed a memorial in Dhaka. It was constructed for the memory of the Greek merchants who died while in Dhaka. The Greek memorial was built around AD 1900, and appears like an ancient Greek temple; it is a small yellow structure on land owned by the Greek Community, which flourished in Dhaka in the 19th century. It is inside the Teacher-Student Centre (TSC) of the University of Dhaka and stands alone on the main Shahbagh Avenue and faces Ramna Race Course. To its southern side is the Atomic Research Centre and to its north a student's centre. It is considered to be the only such structure extant outside Greece.

== History ==
Front of Greek Memorial

In the Catholic Cathedral of Calcutta, the presence of two Greek merchants are found in the Latin Memorial tablets. It is mentioned that they died in Calcutta in 1713 and 1726. They are considered as the earliest Greek merchants to be in Indian-subcontinent. Some Greeks came to the sub-continent by road through Persia and Afghanistan and some others came by Red Sea and the Indian Ocean. The Greeks mostly settled in Calcutta and in Dhaka. Between 1770 and 1800, approximately two hundred Greeks were in Dhaka and Narayanganj. In 1780, the first Greek Orthodox church in Calcutta was built, which shows that there was a Greek community large and prosperous enough to support it.

Most of the Greeks in Dhaka were merchants and they used to trade jute and salt. Somewhere around the mid 19th century their business broke down. In the last quarter of 19th century, a memorial was constructed in Ramna, Dhaka in the memory of the early Greek merchants by the London-based Greek firm of Ralli Brothers. Many historians believed in 1815, it was built at the initiative of priest JM MacDonald of the St Thomas Church. Among the foreigners the Greeks were the last to settle as a community in Dhaka.

== Architecture value ==
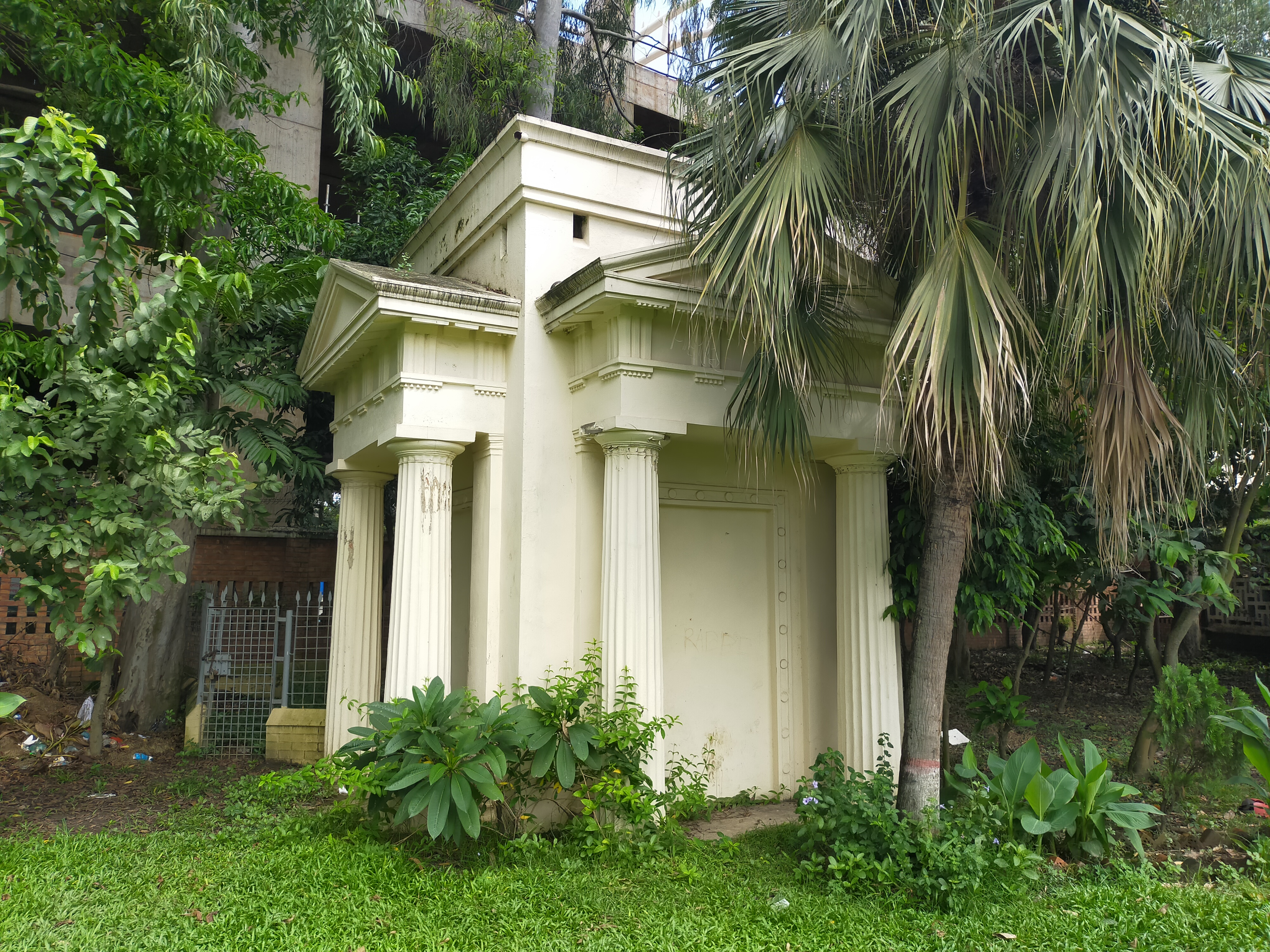
Back of Greek Memorial

The monument is square shaped, which, with its projecting bay, one on each of the four sides, makes a cross plan. The bay is formed by two fluted pillars of Doric order, on which rests the entablature and a triangular pediment. Over the top of the eastern face there is an inscription "MAKARIOI OYS EPHELEPHOY KAI PROSELABOY." One entrance from the east leads into the memorial.

On the walls within are fixed nine inscriptions carved on black stones, and another lies broken on the floor stone is of Sultana Alexander, who died on 6 February 1800. A stone bears the names of the three Ellias brothers. John Demetrius Ellias (d. 1836), one of the brothers, was killed by a tiger while he was hunting at Mirpur, 25 miles off what is now the Dhaka University campus. Basil Demetrius, the Greek clerk at St Thomas' Church, was also buried at the place. Besides being a church clerk, he was also a writing master and a teacher at the Dhaka College for 10 years. He died in 1860.

== Gravestone inscription ==
Few of the Inscriptions are listed below, The information was collected from the transcription done by Dr Helen Abadzi, a Greek staff member of the World Bank.

The ancient Greek inscription on the front frieze reads: "Blessed are those whom you (God) have chosen and have taken with you."

The nine gravestones have the inscriptions in Greek, English, or sometimes in both. Counter clockwise, the gravestone inscription reads:

Gravestone 1 (Greek and English inscription)

Here lies Sulatana, Wife of Alexander (son of) Kyinakos Philippou Politou: 1800; 25 January [by the julian calendar] paid the common debt in Dacca.

Under this stone are deposited the mortal remains of Mrs. Sultana Alexander, who departed the life Tuesday 6 February 1800: aged 34 years.

Gravestone 2 (Greek)

Here lies the late Theodosia, wife of Theodore [son of] George Philippou Politou, 1805, 10 April, paid common debt in Dacca may her memory be everlasting.

Gravestone 3 (English)

To the memory: Mrs. Madalene and Sohia Jordan: also to that their husband, Mr. Joseph Jordan of Cesareah: merchant of Narayangonj. The latter departed this life 10 February 1819; aged about 60 years. This monument is created as a tribute of affection to their memory by their afflicted orphan children.

Gravestone 4 (English poem in Urdu with Latin characters)

- To the memory of Nicholas Demetrus Elias, elder son Demetrius Elias esp. Died 5 March 1843: aged 46 years Mrs. Desired verse
- Dunia ke jo meza hain (whatever joys in the world)
- Haryiz kam na honge (may never be fewer)
- Charcha ahe rahega (the discussion will happen here)
- Afsos hai ham na honge (unfortunately I will not exist)

== Present condition ==
The building was renovated in 1997 at the expenses of the Government of Greece through the initiative of Ambassador Constantinos Ailianos and the active collaboration of former Dhaka University Vice-Chancellor, A. K. Azad Chowdhury. But since then it is left out.
