= Mahbubul Haq =

Mahbubul Haq, (Arabic: محبوب الحق) meaning "beloved of Al Haqq", is a male Muslim given name. Notable bearers of the name include:

- Mahbubul Huq Farhadnagari, East Pakistani politician
- Mahbub ul Haq Gurdaspuri (1934–1998), Pakistani economist and former Finance Minister
- Mahbubul Haque Faridpuri (born 1948), Bangladeshi linguist

== See also ==
- Mahbub
- Haqq (name)
