= Haviv =

Haviv (Hebrew: חָבִיב) is a Hebrew first name and last name meaning "darling" or "likeable". It is cognate to Arab Habib. Notable people with the name include:

Given name:

- Haviv Rettig Gur (born 1981), Israeli journalist
- Haviv Shimoni (1933–1994), Israeli politician

Surname:

- Arie Haviv (born 1956), Israeli footballer
- Avshalom Haviv (1926–1947), Irgun underground member
- Ron Haviv (born 1965), American photojournalist
- Sagi Haviv (born 1974), Israeli graphic designer

== Other ==
- Haviv Elementary School in Rishon LeZion
