= Khabib =

Khabib is a masculine given name. It is a variant of the Arabic name Habib. Notable people with the name include:

== Given name ==
- Khabib (singer) (born 1990) Russian singer
- Khabib Allakhverdiev, (born 1982) Russian boxer
- Khabib Ilyaletdinov, (born 1965) Russian footballer
- Khabib Nurmagomedov, (born 1988) Russian mixed martial artist
- Khabib Syukron (born 1988) Indonesian footballer

== See also ==
- "Khabib", 2019 song by Capital Bra
