= Majelis Rasulullah =

Islamic organization based in Jakarta, Indonesia

- Abbreviation: MR
- Formation: 1998
- Type: Islamic dhikr organization
- Headquarters: Jakarta
- Official language: Bahasa Indonesia
- Leader: Habib Munzir Al-Musawa (1998-2013); Habib Nabiel Al-Musawa (2013-)
- Website: https://www.majelisrasulullah.org/

Majelis Rasulullah is an Islamic religious organization specialized in collective dhikr (set of prayers and recitations) based in Jakarta, Indonesia. The organization was established by the charismatic Muslim leader Munzir Al-Musawa in 1998. Majelis Rasulullah is known for organizing dhikr events with many attendees, typically tens of thousands to sometimes hundreds of thousands. It is the largest dhikr organization in Jakarta.

== History ==
Munzir Al-Musawa studied under the Yemeni Sufi scholar Umar bin Hafiz, and he returned afterward to Jakarta to begin the da'wah (Islamic proselytizing) in 1998. He then began holding the majelis (religious gathering) every Monday night, in the same style Umar bin Hafiz was conducting in Yemen. During the first months, he invited people door to door to teach about Islam. The majelis was soon named Majelis Rasulullah which means "majlis (congregation) of the prophet Muhammad", as the content was regarding the teaching and conduct of Muhammad.

The majelis soon witnessed the explosive growth, holding major events around Jakarta and even overseas including Singapore and Malaysia. These national level events were held in city centers such as Monas and Senayan area, and attended by hundreds of thousands to millions of people. Munzir soon expanded the activity to the TV media by creating Islamic programs. They also established a fundraising division known as Kios Nabawi in 2006 to sell merchandise related to the majelis, including jackets, stickers, and helmets bearing the name of the organization which are worn by the attendees during the events. Today, the organization is the largest in Jakarta as a majelis dhikr, and the majority of the congregation is youths with age between 18 and 34 years old.

== Activity ==
Majelis Rasulullah holds their routine gathering every Tuesday night in the great mosque of Al-Munawwar in Pancoran, South Jakarta. They also hold national level events which take place in places like Monas and Merdeka Square. The national level events take place for example during the Mawlid, an anniversary of the Islamic prophet Muhammad's birthday or in the form of Tabligh Akbar. The national level event often invites high-profile national or international figures, including the former president of Indonesia Susilo Bambang Yudhoyono, vice president Jusuf Kalla, and the Yemeni Sufi scholar Umar bin Hafiz.
