= Dhaka University Film Society =

- DUFS Logo
- Abbreviation: DUFS
- Formation: 1991; 35 years ago
- Type: Voluntary Students' Organization
- Legal status: Registered
- Purpose: Entertainment, film movement, film screening
- Headquarters: TSC, (2nd Floor), University of Dhaka, Dhaka, Bangladesh
- Location: TSC, University of Dhaka, Bangladesh
- Region served: Bangladesh
- Members: Reserved for Dhaka University Students
- Official language: Bengali, English
- President General Secretary: Rehnuma Shahreen; Sumantta Sarker Arpon
- Main organ: Executive Committee
- Parent organization: Dhaka University Central Students' Union
- Affiliations: Federation of Film Societies of Bangladesh
- Volunteers: Around 150
- Website: dufs.org

Dhaka University Film Society (in short DUFS) is a voluntary organization affiliated with the Dhaka University Central Students Union (DUCSU) at University of Dhaka. It is registered under the Film Societies Act 2011 and a member of Federation of Film Societies, Bangladesh (FFSB). DUFS is also registered with the Bangladesh Film Censor Board. DUFS started its journey in 1962 during the Film Society Movement. Since then, the organization’s main mission remains the same, which is to create viewers of good movies with adequate taste. The organization had started its journey with the motto, 'Better Film, Better Viewers'.

== Activities ==
As a part of its mission, DUFS have successfully organized many film oriented programs such as: film festivals, appreciation courses, seminars, workshops, rallies, retrospectives and so on. World Film Manifestation Programme (WFMP) is one of its successful programs with over 400 movie screenings. Some of the major regular festivals of DUFS are 'Amar Bhashar Chalachchitra’, 'International Inter University Short Film Festival’, 'Film for Freshers', ‘World Film Manifestation Program’ and ‘Women's lens film Festival’. Beside these, DUFS has been publishing its official publication Flashback for the past 20 years.

=== World Film Manifestation Program ===
World Film Manifestation Program, commonly known as WFMP, is a monthly film screening by DUFS at different cultural centers such as the Goethe-Institut Dhaka and the Alliance Française de Dhaka among others. WFMP's main objective is to introduce classic and contemporary films to film society members. The program is open for all.

DUFS recently organized the 130th edition of WFMP, WFMP on Remembering Agnès Varda at Alliance Française de Dhaka on 22–13 July 2019. 4 films by the French new wave filmmaker were screened.

La Pointe Courte (1955), Cleo from 5 to 7 (1962), Le Bonheur (1965), Vegabond (1985)

The program was started as a "viewer's forum" in June 1998 at the Goethe-Institute Dhaka. The first session was open to everyone. In the next two years, fourteen more sessions were held in different cultural centers in Dhaka. After various sessions, the initiative was renamed as World Film Manifestation Program (WFMP).

The first 1st WFMP session was held in September 2000 at the Goethe-Institute Dhaka.

=== Flashback ===
Flashback is the official publication of DUFS. It is published annually for more than fourteen years. The publication is about specific topics in the film industry. The latest issue of flashback on East European Films was published in July 2019. Flashback: Independent Film was published in November 2018. Some issues of the publication included articles about films from Latin America and those from the Far East. One Flashback was centered around Rabindranath Tagore in remembrance of his 150th birth anniversary.

=== Study circle ===
The study circle is a weekly program for members moderated by the study circle secretary. The circle discusses a pre-selected topic relevant to films. Study circles are moderated by an expert facilitator on the selected topic. The study circle sessions are open for all.

=== Others ===
DUFS regularly organizes film workshops, film orientation courses, and film appreciation courses. The 7th film workshop organized by DUFS was held on 25 July to 9 August. Two short films were produced through the workshop. Film Orientation Courses are designed towards enabling the new members to learn basic knowledge about film viewing and making. Appreciation courses are designed to guide the standard film viewer towards a more insightful understanding of cinema.

DUFS has a library for its members. The library has a rich collection of books on cinema. Members can books and newspapers at the DUFS room.

Besides all these, DUFS organizes a number of film screening sessions throughout the year, often in collaboration with other film societies and cultural centers. "Sunday German-Bangla Film Screening" is held every last Sunday of each month, where one German and one Bengali movie is shown at the Goethe Institute.

== Festivals ==
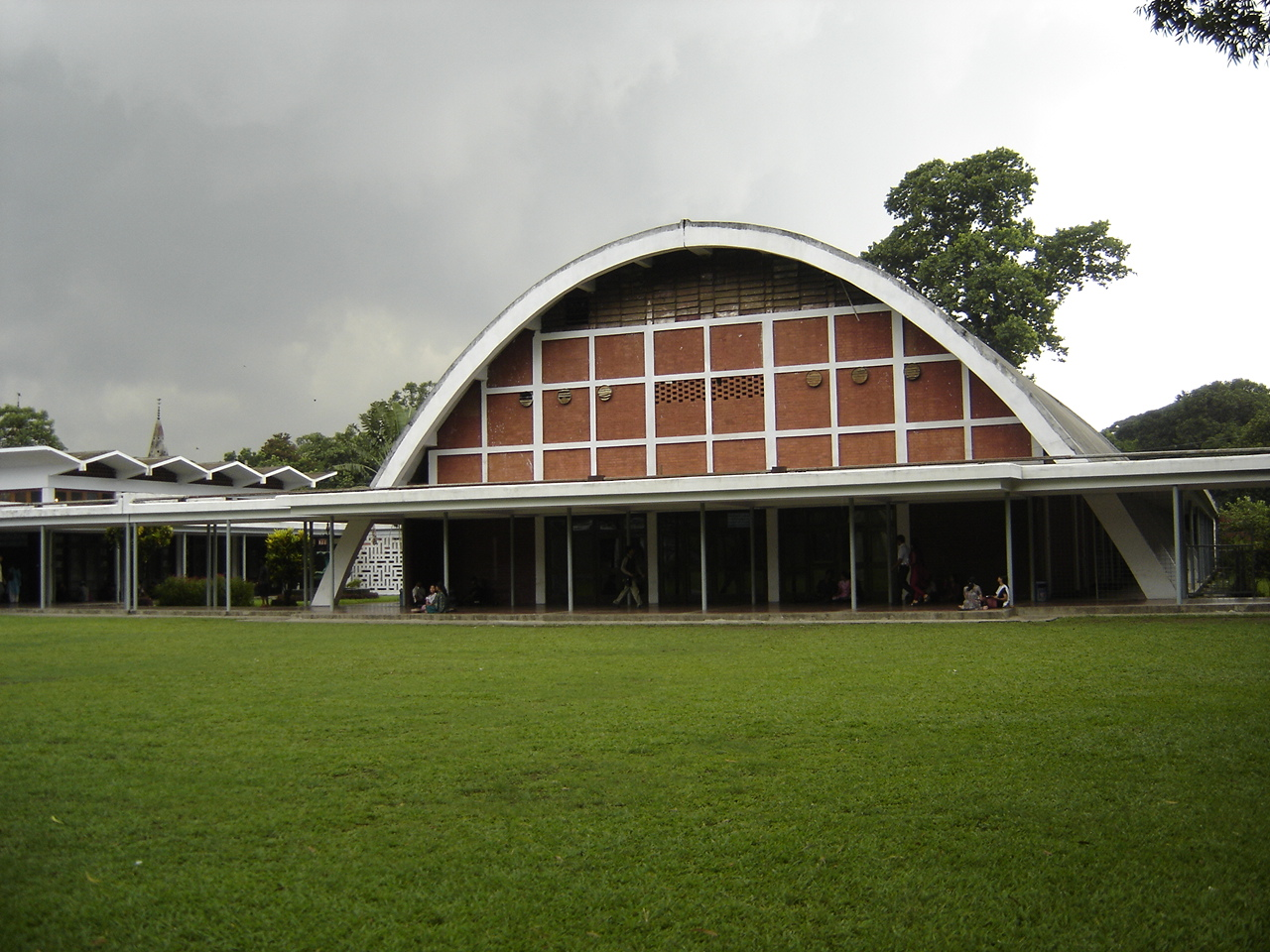
TSC Auditorim

Dhaka University Film Society organized more than thirty major film festivals so far. It has been playing an active as a cultural organization at the university and the country as well.

Amar Bhasar Chalachitra (Films in my language) is an annual film festival organized by DUFS at the TSC complex. The festival is held every February month in remembrance of the martyrs of the Bengali language movement. DUFS organized the 20th edition of the Festival, 'Amar Bhasar Chalachitra 1428' on 22-26 February 2022. The festival was first held in 2004. It is now recognized as the biggest film festival in the Bengali language. The highest grossing Bangladeshi film of all time Priyotoma was screened at the 22nd Amar Bashar Chalachitra festival under the theme of Amar Bhashar Chalachitra Utshab 1430 organized by the Dhaka University Film Society on 14 February 2024 on the occasion of Valentine's Day.

International Inter-University Short Film Festival (IIUSFF) is an annual film festival organized by DUFS. It has been running for over a decade with the slogan "Take your camera, frame your dream". Its goal is to create a cross-cultural platform for university-going filmmakers all over the world. DUFS has recently organized the 11th edition of IIUSFF, in association with the United Nations High Commissioner for Refugees (UNHCR). 1401 short films from more than 90 countries were submitted. Since 10th IIUSFF a new category, 'Short films on refugee' has been introduced to address the refugee crisis around the globe.

'Short film festival on cultural diversity and peace' was introduced in 2019. DUFS and Actionaid Bangladesh jointly organized the event to promote cultural diversity and peace.

Film for Freshers is the yearly film screening for the university freshers. It is open to all freshers. Boichitre Jibon (Diversity is Life) is jointly organized by Dhaka University Film Society and National Disabled Forum, in association with Sightsavers in 2010 and 2013.

The major festivals organized by DUFS at the TSC auditorium, Shawkat Osman Memorial Auditorium and at different cultural centers in Dhaka are as follows.

Year	Name	Date	Venue	Number of Film Screening	Types of Film
1994	First National Film Festival		Shawkat Osman Memorial Auditorium, Public Library		Bangladeshi Cinema
1996	চলচ্চিত্র শতবর্ষ উৎসব		TSC auditorium and Bangladesh Shilpakala Academy Auditorium		
1998	Science Fiction Film Week		Shawkat Osman Memorial Auditorium, Public Library		Science fiction film
1998	HELP: the Flood Victims		Shawkat Osman Memorial Auditorium, Public Library		Various films to help flood victims
1999	War Film Week		Shawkat Osman Memorial Auditorium, Public Library		War film
1999	Oscar Film Week		Shawkat Osman Memorial Auditorium, Public Library		Oscar-winning films
2000	Film for Freshers		TSC auditorium	6	Various films for freshers of Dhaka University
2000	Comedy Film Week	1–7 October	Shawkat Osman Memorial Auditorium, Public Library	25	Classic and modern comedy films
2001	Film for Freshers		TSC auditorium		Various films for freshers of Dhaka University
2002	Week on Film Classics		Shawkat Osman Memorial Auditorium, Public Library		Classic films from all over the world
2002	ভাষা আন্দোলনের ৫০ বছরঃ চলচ্চিত্রে বাংলার মুখ (50 years of language movement:Bengali in films)		TSC auditorium	15	Bangladeshi cinema
2003	Film for Freshers		TSC auditorium		Various films for freshers of Dhaka University
2003	সত্যজিতের চলচ্চিত্র (Film of Satyajit)		TSC auditorium	21	Film of Satyajit
2004	বাংলা চলচ্চিত্র উৎসব (Bengali Film Festival)	11–18 May	TSC auditorium	28	Bengali films from both Bangladesh and India
2005	বাংলার ছবি (Film of Bengal)		TSC auditorium		Bangladeshi cinema
2005	Film for Freshers		TSC auditorium		Various films for freshers of Dhaka University
2005	Animation Film Festival	28 November–2 December	TSC auditorium		Animation film
2006	50 years of Bangladeshi Film		TSC auditorium		Bangladeshi cinema
2006	Film for Freshers		TSC auditorium		Various films for freshers of Dhaka University
2007	আমার ভাষার চলচ্চিত্র (Amar Vashar Cholochitro)	24–28 February	TSC auditorium	20	Bengali film from both Bangladesh and India
2007	ক্যামেরা যখন রাইফেল (When camera is rifle)		TSC auditorium		
2007	অপরাজিত (Unbeaten)		TSC auditorium		Various film to help the Cyclone Sidr survivors
2007	International Inter-University Short Film Festival (IIUSFF)		Goethe Institute Dhaka		International short film competition for university students.
2008	আমার ভাষার চলচ্চিত্র (Amar Vashar Cholochitro)	22–28 February	TSC auditorium	28	Bengali film from both Bangladesh and West Bengal
2008	Film for Freshers	18–21 August	TSC auditorium	12	Various films for freshers of Dhaka University
2008	2nd International Inter-University Short Film Festival (IIUSFF)	21–23 April	Goethe Institute Dhaka		International short film competition for university students.
2009	আমার ভাষার চলচ্চিত্র (Amar Vashar Cholochitro)	13–18 February	TSC auditorium	24	Bengali film from both Bangladesh and West Bengal
2009	Film for Freshers	5–7 May	TSC auditorium	12	Various films for freshers of Dhaka University
2009	3rd International Inter-University Short Film Festival (IIUSFF)	25–26 May	Goethe Institute Dhaka		International short film competition for university students.
2009	Disaster Risk Reduction Film Festival (Bengali: দুর্যোগ প্রস্তুতি বিষয়ক চলচ্চিত্র উৎসব)		Shawkat Osman Memorial Auditorium, Public Library		Disaster related films
2010	আমার ভাষার চলচ্চিত্র-১৪১৬ (Amar Vashar Cholochitro-1416)	22–28 February	TSC auditorium		Bengali film from both Bangladesh and West Bengal
2010	4th International Inter-University Short Film Festival (IIUSFF)	24–28 April	TSC auditorium and Goethe Institute Dhaka		International short film competition for university students.
2010	বৈচিত্র্যে জীবন (Diversity of life)	4–8 December	TSC auditorium	34	First national disability related film festival
2011	আমার ভাষার চলচ্চিত্র-১৪১৭ (Amar Vashar Cholochitro-1417)	24–28 February	TSC auditorium	20	Bengali film from both Bangladesh and West Bengal
2011	ছায়াচিত্রে রবীন্দ্রনাথ (Rabindranath in Films)		TSC auditorium		Films based on Rabindranath Tagore works
2011	5th International Inter-University Short Film Festival (IIUSFF)	15–19 May	Goethe Institute Dhaka		International short film competition for university students.
2012	আমার ভাষার চলচ্চিত্র-১৪১৮ (Amar Vashar Cholochitro-1418)	23–28 February	TSC auditorium	19	Bengali film from both Bangladesh and West Bengal
2012	চলচ্চিত্রে হুমায়ুন আহমেদ (Humayun Ahmed in Films)	24–26 September	TSC auditorium	9	In remembrance of late novelist and filmmaker Humayun Ahmed
2013	আমার ভাষার চলচ্চিত্র-১৪১৯ (Amar Vashar Cholochitro-1419)	23–28 February	TSC auditorium	23	Bengali film from both Bangladesh West Bengal
2013	Film for Freshers	19–22 May	TSC auditorium	12	Various films for freshers of Dhaka University freshers.
2013	6th International Inter-University Short Film Festival (IIUSFF)		Goethe Institute Dhaka		International short film competition for university students.
2013	বৈচিত্র্যে জীবন (Diversity of life)	9–11 December	TSC auditorium	12	Second national disability related film festival
2014	আমার ভাষার চলচ্চিত্র-১৪২০ (Amar Vashar Cholochitro-1420)	22–27 February	TSC auditorium	24	Bengali film from both Bangladesh and West Bengal
2014	Animation Film Festival	3–9 November	TSC auditorium	18	Animation film
2015	7th International Inter-University Short Film Festival (IIUSFF)	26–28 January	TSC auditorium	45	International short film competition for university students.
2015	আমার ভাষার চলচ্চিত্র-১৪২১ (Amar Vashar Cholochitro-1421)	23–28 February	TSC auditorium	24	Bengali film from both Bangladesh and West Bengal
2015	Film for Freshers	17-18 August	TSC auditorium	9	Various films for freshers of Dhaka University freshers.
2016	8th International Inter-University Short Film Festival (IIUSFF)		TSC auditorium Alliance Française de Dhaka Alliance Française de Chittagong		International short film competition for university students.
2016	6th Film Workshop 2016	21 July- 5 August			
2017	আমার ভাষার চলচ্চিত্র-১৪২২ (Amar Vashar Cholochitro-1422)	10-14 February	TSC auditorium	20	Bengali film from both Bangladesh West and Bengal
2017	Animation Film Festival 2017	20-23 March	TSC auditorium	15	Animation Films from all over the world
2017	Film Orientation Course 2017		Munir Chowdhury Auditorium, TSC		
2017	9th International Inter-University Short Film Festival (IIUSFF)	11 August -14 September	TSC auditorium Alliance Française de Dhaka Star Cineplex Dhaka	90	International short film competition for university students.
2018	আমার ভাষার চলচ্চিত্র-১৪২৪ (Amar Vashar Cholochitro-1424)	12-17 February	TSC Auditorium	20	Bengali film from both Bangladesh and West Bengal
2018	10th International Inter-University Short Film Festival	2-4 September	TSC auditorium Alliance Française de Dhaka Goethe Institut Bangladesh	200	International short film competition for university students.
2018	Film Appreciation Course 2018	10 October-13 October	Shaheed Munier Chowdhury Seminar Room		
2018	Human Rights Short Film Festival	08-9 December	Bangladesh Shishu Academy Complex	60	The theme of this film festival is "Finding Bangladesh and South Asia in the Universal Declaration of Human Rights, 70 years later".
2019	আমার ভাষার চলচ্চিত্র-১৪২৫ (Amar Vashar Cholochitro-1425)	10-14 February	TSC auditorium	17	Bengali film from both Bangladesh West and Bengal
2019	11th International Inter-University Short Film Festival	29-31 July	TSC auditorium Alliance Française de Dhaka Goethe Institut Bangladesh	200	International short film competition for university students.
2019	7th Film Workshop	25 July- 9 August	CARASS Auditorium		
2019	Short Film Festival on Cultural Diversity and Peace	08-9 September	TSC auditorium	50	Short film festival to promote cultural diversity and peace.

== Membership ==
New members are admitted in the society in April each year. Only fresher students of Dhaka University are eligible to apply for membership. After an initial screening process, viva-voce (oral interview) is held to select the few successful (around forty) candidates for admission. At present, there are 227 members of whom thirty-three are executive members and others are general members. The current president is Teertha Protim Das; the general secretary is Nisath Salsabil Rob.

== Notable alumni ==
- Abu Shahed Emon has turned himself into a successful filmmaker after his debut full-length feature film Jalaler Golpo

== See also ==
- List of film schools
