= Habib Gorgi =

Habib Gorgi (1892–1965) was an artist of the turn of the century pioneer generation of Egyptian modern art. He graduated from Teacher Training School then received a scholarship to England in 1920 to study pedagogic methods of art teaching, and watercolors. An early pioneer of art education, and the author of the first Arabic book on the subject in 1936. He taught graduates of the Fine and Applied Arts Colleges to prepare them to become arts teachers and get their National Teacher's Certificate. He established the Art Advocates Society in 1928 for artist investigating Egyptian identity through art, and watercolors in particular. His Spontaneous Sculpture School and the Textile Drawing School was continued by son-in-law Ramses Wissa Wassef in Harraneya. He represented Egypt in conferences on art teaching in Paris from 1936, and his educational experiments became an inspiration to major international writers, including Wilhelm Viola, in his book The Art of the Child. During his scholarship period in England, he specialized in watercolours. Habib Georghe was interested in the aesthetics of Egyptian art, and adopted this through his call for painting Egyptian landscapes, and through his establishing the Folk Art School, where he fostered a number of spontaneous artists, including Sayeda Massak, Samira Hosny, Yehya Bu Seri', Bodour Girgis, who were all talented in environmental sculpture, in the period from 1938 to 1951.

== Philosophy ==
He built a Folk Art School on the principles of the Swiss psychologist Carl Jung concerning the collective unconscious. Gorgi postulated that the Egyptian genius that had brought forth the Pharaonic, Coptic and Islamic art traditions was still present in the being of modern Egyptians, as they were interacting with the same environment, society, climate and genetic factors. If a child, not exposed to the patterns of Western schooling, was given the chance for self-expression through clays, or sculpture, or textiles, the inherent genius would burst forth. His experiment worked, and was acknowledged and admired both in Egypt and abroad.

== Watercolors ==
He was an accomplished watercolorist, who painted Egyptian landscapes in the outdoors. For example, Christian monasteries standing in the heart of the desert in a pure style reflecting their almost mystical austerity and severity.

== Habib Gorgi Museum ==
In 1971, Ramses Wissa Wassef designed and built a museum to the teaching experiment and philosophy of Habib Gorgi. The museum at the Ramses Wissa Wassef Art Centre in Giza, Egypt, displayed terracotta figurative sculptures by children and young adults.

== Artist CV ==
Education - Studied mathematics at the Teachers College. However, he shifted his attention to art (drawing) in 1915. Occupation - Teacher, dean and art inspector at the Teachers College. Solo exhibitions Unesco, London. - Retrospective exhibition of Habib Georgy's work, Picasso art gallery, 2000. Retrospective exhibition display work of Habib Goergy, his students and son, the Center of Art in Zamalek, Cairo, 2001. National exhibitions - Exhibitions organised by Art Welfare Society, Cairo Salon, in the 1930s.

== Collections ==
The Egyptian Museum of Modern Art in Cairo. Habib Gorgi Museum of the Ramses Wissa Wassef Art Centre, Giza, Egypt.
