= Jawed Habib =

Indian politician and hairstylist

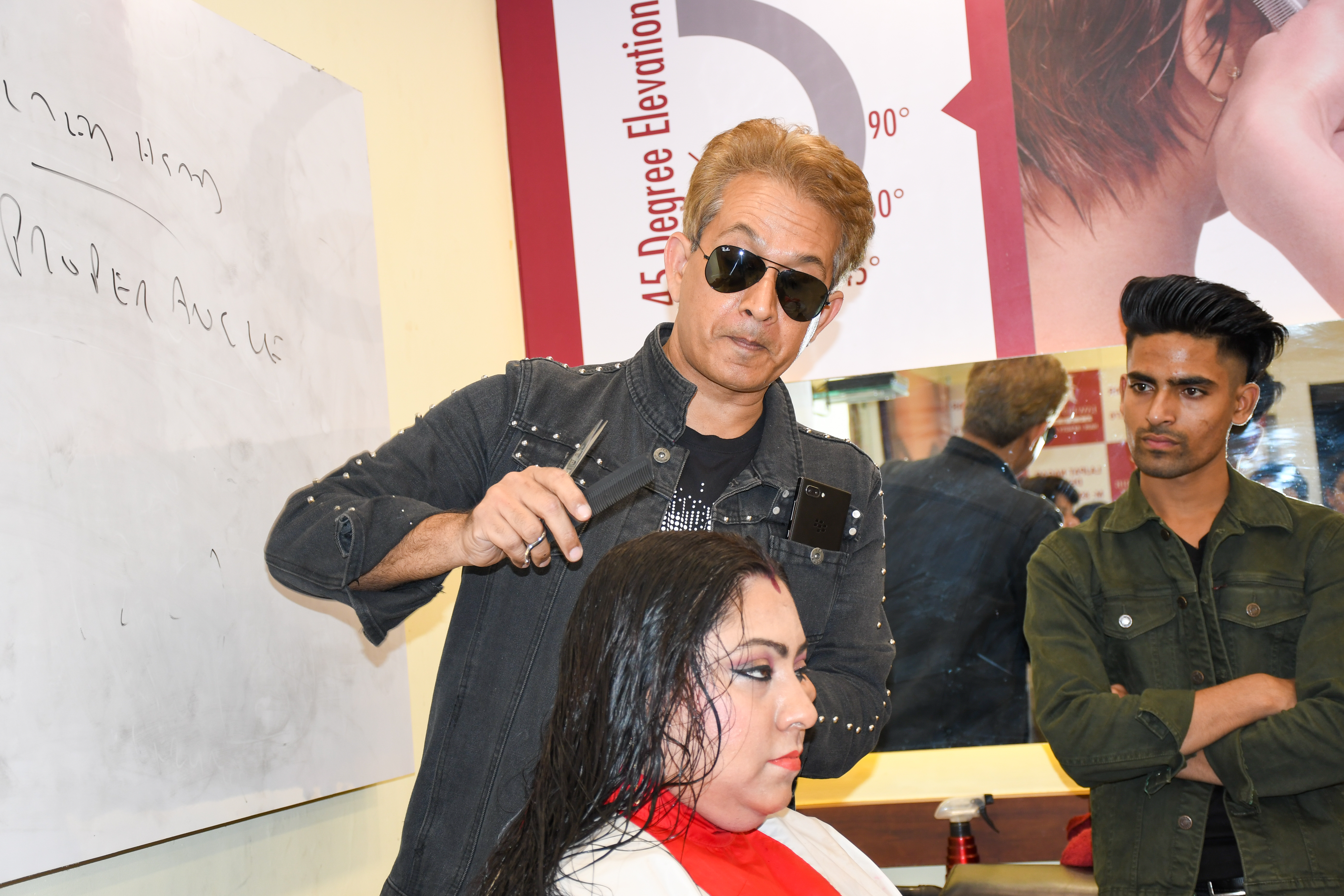
- Born: Jawed Habib; Jalalabad, Shamli, Uttar Pradesh, India
- Occupations: Hairstylist, businessman, tv personality, politician
- Political party: Bharatiya Janata Party (2019-present)
- Spouse: Shaheen Akhter (m. 1990)
- Children: 2
- Website: Official website

Jawed Habib (born 26 June 1963) is an Indian hairstylist, businessman and politician. Habib owns Jawed Habib Hair and Beauty Ltd., which operates across the country.

== Early life and background ==
Habib's grandfather Nazir Ahmed served as the official hairdresser for Lord Linlithgow, Lord Mountbatten, and Jawaharlal Nehru.

His father Habib Ahmed also worked for the President of India at the Rashtrapati Bhavan.

Habib attended the Jawaharlal Nehru University, obtaining a degree in French literature. During this time, he was the captain of the university cricket team and wanted to become a cricketer. At the advice of his father, he later attended the Morris School of Hairdressing.

== Career ==
In 1984, Jawed Habib started working with his father in their first salon, Habib's Hair and Beauty, in The Oberoi Hotel in New Delhi. Wanting international exposure and education, he went to London, UK to study advanced techniques in Morris School of Hairdressing. Habib joined the Bharatiya Janata Party in April 2019.

== Controversies ==
In January 2022, a video of Jawed Habib using his spit to style a woman's hair during a workshop in Muzaffarnagar, Uttar Pradesh went viral. He later apologised for the act.

In 2025, Jawed Habib, his son Anas Habib, and other family members were accused in multiple criminal investigations over an alleged cryptocurrency fraud. Police in Sambhal, Uttar Pradesh, filed 20 First Information Reports (FIRs) against the Habib family for allegedly duping over 100 investors — reportedly promising returns of 50-75% on investments made in Bitcoin and Binance Coin through a company identified as Follicle Global Company (FLC). The scheme is said to have operated from a 2023 event in the Saraitareen area, where each investor invested approximately INR 5-7 lakh. Authorities have issued look-out notices against all family members to prevent them from leaving the country, and summoned Habib for questioning.
