= Mahboubeh =

Mahboubeh is a feminine given name. People with the name include:

- Mahboubeh Abbasgholizadeh (born 1958), Iranian women's rights activist, researcher and film-maker
- Mahboubeh Honarian (born 1962), Iranian-Canadian documentary filmmaker
- Mahboubeh Barbari Zharfi (born 1991), Iranian judoka
