= Mehboob Bawa =

South African actor and producer

- Born: 28 March 1968 (age 58); Cape Town, South Africa
- Occupations: Actor, producer
- Years active: 1994–present
- Spouse: Razia Rawoot

Mehboob Bawa (born 28 March 1968) is a South African actor, producer, singer, and MC. He is best known for producing and starring in the film Bhai's Cafe.

== Personal life ==
Mehboob Bawa was born in Cape Town, South Africa. He completed a Television Presentation Course at SABC.

== Career ==
In 1994, he appeared in the direct-to-video film The Visual Bible: Acts. Then in 1996, he made the feature film debut with the role "Taxi chaufför" in the film The White Lioness. Since then, he acted in the films such as; Mandela and de Klerk, Pirates of the Plain, Mama Jack and Supernova. Meanwhile, in 2000, he made television acting debut with the serial Madam & Eve. In 2007, he made the popular role "Ahmed Kathrada" in the Hollywood blockbuster award winning film Goodbye Bafana directed by Bille August.

In 2009, he appeared in the NBC American action drama television series The Philanthropist and then in the serial Final Verdict in 2011. Apart from acting, he started to produce the films especially Indian films shot in South Africa. He worked as the line producer of many blockbuster Bollywood films such as; Agent Vinod, Cocktail, Murder 3, Aashiqui 2, Khamoshiyan, Mr. X, Hamari Adhuri Kahani and Sanju. In 2016, he played the role of Dr. Khan in the serial Jab. In 2019 he produced the Bollywood style South African musical comedy-drama film Bhai's Cafe, where he played the titular role of Bhai. The premise was based on the cafe his family ran when he was growing up. Even though the film had a brief theatrical release in February 2020, the film became a Box Office when cinemas closed the following month after moved to DStv.

== Filmography ==
=== Film ===
Year	Title	Role	Notes
1994	The Visual Bible: Acts	#Pharisee 3	Direct-to-video
1996	The White Lioness	Taxi chaufför	
1999	Pirates of the Plain	Doctor	
2005	Mama Jack	Sky Presenter	
2007	Goodbye Bafana	Ahmed Kathrada	
2010	Schuks Tshabalala's Survival Guide to South Africa	Rajin	
2012	Agent Vinod	—N/a	line producer, casting director, location scout
2012	Cocktail	—N/a	line producer
2013	Murder 3	—N/a	line producer
2013	Aashiqui 2	—N/a	line producer
2013	Magic Bullet	Sonny	Short film
2014	The Perfect Wave	Doctor	
2015	Schuks! Pay Back the Money!	Officer	
2015	Khamoshiyan	—N/a	line producer
2015	Mr. X	—N/a	line producer
2015	Hamari Adhuri Kahani	—N/a	line producer
2015	Singh Is Bliing	—N/a	line producer
2016	Love Games	—N/a	line producer
2017	Jagga Jasoos	—N/a	line producer
2017	Half Girlfriend	—N/a	line producer
2018	Sanju	—N/a	line producer
2019	Bhai's Cafe	Bhai	executive producer

=== Television ===
Year	Title	Role	Notes
1997	Mandela and de Klerk	T.V. Reporter	Television film
2000	Madam & Eve	Mr. Patela / Rajesh Pahad	TV series
2005	Spring Break Shark Attack	Professor Wellington	Television film
2005	Supernova	Dr. Rani Vahpayee	Television film
2006	The Librarian: Return to King Solomon's Mines	Taxi Driver	Television film
2007	Anner House	Asif	Television film
2008	Generation Kill	Vendor	Miniseries; episode: "Get Some"
2009	The Philanthropist	Board Member	TV series
2011	Final Verdict	Advocate Priem	
2012	Khululeka	Shopkeeper	Series
2016	That London Guy	Mr. Patel	TV series
2016	Jab	Dr. Khan	4 episodes
2017	The Indian Detective	Bespectacled Man	TV series
2021	Die Sentrum	Abdul	TV series
