= Habib Rahiab =

Habib Rahiab is a human rights lawyer. He graduated from Harvard Law School in 2008. He has been a visiting fellow at Human Rights Program, Harvard Law School. Rahiab was previously employed as a field researcher in Afghanistan and Pakistan by Human Rights Watch. While in Afghanistan, he documented human rights abuses and war crimes, and was eventually forced to flee the country. Rahiab was granted asylum with his family in the United States in 2004. In 2004, he received the Annual Award for Monitoring Human Rights.
