= Habib Abou Sakr =

Lebanese politician

H.E. Dr Habib Abou-Sakr is a Lebanese Maronite academic who served as secretary general of finance under various Lebanese governments as well as vice-chancellor of the Catholic University of St Paul La Sagesse.
