= Habib Tajmiri =

Iranian actor

- حبیب تاجمیری
- Born: 22 March 1986 (age 40); Masjed Soleyman, Iran
- Education: Tehran Media College
- Occupation: Actor
- Years active: 2002–present

Habib Tajmiri (born 22 April 1986 in Masjed-e-Suleiman) is an Iranian film and television actor who has also worked in theater.

Tajmiri holds a bachelor's degree in acting from Tehran Media College. He began his artistic career in the field of acting and directing short films at the Islamic Republic of Iran Broadcasting and began his acting career by starring in the film The 12th Friend in 2002.

== Artistic career ==
=== Theater ===
- Number1 Show
- Khin Wedding Show

=== Cinematic ===
- Legend of the Moon TT (2010)
- Inversion (2015)
- Yarda (2018)
- Baron Mandir (2019)
- The Wolf Cubs of Apple Valley (2019)
- Snow Mother (2019)
- The Verdict (2020)
- Gogri (2020)
- Maherkh House (2020)
- Cold Night (2021)
- Balith (2021)
- 7600 (2022)
- Those Two (2023)
- Ring (2023)

=== Series ===
Year	Name	Side	Director	Description
2022	Parole	Actor	Masoud Dehnamaki	Network 1

=== Home Display Network ===
Year	Collection name	Side	Director	Play from
2018	There	Actor	Amir Sadeghi	فیلیمو
2018	Skier	Actor	Fereydoun Najafi	فیلیمو

== Awards ==
He won the Best Actor award from the Yasuj Regional Festival for the play "The Wedding of a Traitor" in 2006 and the Best Actor award at the second Mehr Festival of Iranian Cinema.
