= Mahboob Meena Shah =

Indian Sufi saint (1934–2020)

Baba Ji Mahboob Meena Shah
- محبوب مینا شاہ

Personal life
- Born: 3 July 1934 (21 Rabi' al-Awwal, 1353 AH) Yahiyaganj, Lucknow, British India
- Died: 18 September 2020 (aged 86) (29 Muharram, 1442AH) Gonda, Uttar Pradesh, India
- Resting place: Darbar-e-Aliya Minaiya
- Parent: Maulvi Jiyauddin (father)
- Citizenship: Indian
- Era: Contemporary
- Education: Muslim University
- Other name: born Aziz Hasan
- Relations: Saeed Hasan (nephew)

Religious life
- Religion: Islam
- Denomination: Sunni
- Founder of: Meena Shah Institute of Technology and Management (MSITM) Degree College
- Jurisprudence: Hanafi
- Tariqa: Chisti
- Creed: Maturidi
- Movement: Barelvi

Muslim leader
- Disciple of: Ikram Meena Shah

Aziz Hasan (Romanized: 'Aziz Ḥasan, Hindi: अज़ीज़ हसन, Urdu: عزیز حسن) a.k.a. Mahboob Meena shah, popularly Baba Ji (3 July 1934 – 18 September 2020) was an Indian Sufi saint and social worker.

== Early life ==
He was born in Yahiyaganj, Lucknow. His birth name was Aziz Hasan.

He joined Indian Navy in 1944 at the age of 10 and went to Singapore during World War II.

== Education ==
He completed his primary education at Hussainabad Inter College, Lucknow then intermediate from H.A.I.S. Bahadur Inter college. He pursued his higher education from Muslim University.

== Career ==
In the year of 1967 he met to Ikram Meena shah and started his Sufism life. He served his life for Madrasa Amirul Uloom Minaiya(est.1983). Later in 1998 he founded MSITM Degree College (Gonda).

He was Sajjada nashin at Darbar-e-Aliya Minaiya.

== Death ==
He died on 18 September 2020.

== See also ==
- Sufism in India
- Barelvi
