= Mahbuba Nasreen =

Professor and Pro-Vice Chancellor of Bangladesh Open University

- মাহবুবা নাসরীন

Pro Vice-chancellor of the Bangladesh Open University
- Incumbent
- Assumed office 9 July 2019
- Chancellor: President of Bangladesh

Personal details
- Born: Faridpur District, Bangladesh
- Education: Ph.D.
- Alma mater: University of Dhaka; Massey University

Mahbuba Nasreen (born February 1963) is a Bangladeshi academic. In 2023 she was the Pro Vice Chancellor of Bangladesh Open University.

== Early life and education ==
Nasreen was born in February 1963 in Jhiltuly, Faridpur. She pursued her PhD degree at Massey University in New Zealand under a Commonwealth Scholarship, focusing on the intersection of gender and disaster studies Her thesis was titled Coping with Floods: the Experiences of Rural Women in Bangladesh.

== Career ==
Nasreen began her academic career in 1988 as a Lecturer in the Department of Sociology at the University of Dhaka. She received her PhD degree in 1991 with a Commonwealth Scholarship from New Zealand, developing a grounded theory on women's contributions to disasters. From 2005-2012, she served as a Professor of Sociology before being appointed as the Director of IDMVS.

Nasreen was involved in various academic, administrative, and co-curricular activities at the University of Dhaka. She was a co-founder and director of the Institute of Disaster Management and Vulnerability Studies (IDMVS), University of Dhaka. She writes on this subject for national newspapers. Nasreen serves as the Chief Moderator of the Dhaka University Debating Society.

Nasreen received the Mary Fran Myers Award, 2016 from the Natural Hazards Centre at the University of Colorado (Boulder), USA for her contributions in the field of Disaster and Gender studies over thirty years. She is also the country lead of Gender and Disaster Network in Bangladesh. She has also chaired the selection committee, 2018 for the same award.
