= Anwara Habib =

Bangladeshi politician (c.1928–2018)

Member of Parliament for Reserved Women's Seat-14
- In office 5 March 1991 – 24 November 1995

Personal details
- Born: c. 1928
- Died: 27 May 2018 (aged 90)
- Political party: Bangladesh Nationalist Party

Anwara Habib (c. 1928 – 27 May 2018) was a Bangladeshi politician from Tangail belonging to Bangladesh Nationalist Party. She was a member of the Jatiya Sangsad.

== Biography ==
Habib was a member of the central committee of Bangladesh Nationalist Party. She was elected as a member of the Jatiya Sangsad from Reserved Women's Seat-14 in 1991.

Habib died on 27 May 2018 at Ibn Sina Hospital in Dhaka at the age of 90.
