= Mehboob Rahi =

Mehboob Rahi is a prominent poet of modern Urdu poetry. He also has a PHD on the life of another prominent Urdu poet, Muzaffar Hanfi, published in 1984, from Nagpur University.

== Awards ==
- Bal Sahitya Puraskar of Kendriya sahitya academy 2014
- Muzaffar Hanfi International Urdu Award in 2021

== Books ==
- AINA-E-WATAN
- ANAP SHANAP
- BAZYAFT
- DR MUZAFFAR HANFI HAYAT SHAKHSIYAT AUR KARNAME
- MAHAKTI PHULWARI
- NAI PHULWARI
- PESH RAFT
- SABAT
- SAFAR HAI SHART
- TAJZIYAT-O-TABIRAT
- TAWILAT-O-TAMSILAT
- TERI AWAZ MAKKE AUR MADINE
- ZINDAGI APNI
