= Habib Chawki Hamraoui =

Algerian diplomat, politician (born 1962)

Ambassador of Algeria to Romania
- In office 2009–2014
- Succeeded by: Taous Djellouli

Algerian Minister of Communications
- In office 1997–1998
- Preceded by: Mihoubi El Mihoub
- Succeeded by: Abdelaziz Rahabi

Algerian Minister of Culture
- In office 1992–1994
- Preceded by: Aboubakr Belkaid
- Succeeded by: Slimane Cheikh

Personal details
- Born: July 5, 1962 (age 64) Hydra, Algiers, Algeria
- Party: FLN
- Occupation: Journalist, politician

Habib Chawki Hamraoui is an Algerian politician and journalist who served as Minister of Culture from 1992 to 1994, Minister of Communication from 1997 to 1998, and later ambassador to Romania from 2009 to 2014.

== Biography ==
Hamraoui was born in Hydra, Algiers, Algeria on July 5, 1962. His family is originally from Tlemcen. L'Expression said that Hamraoui was from Aïn El Kebira, in Sétif.

Hamraoui first began his career in broadcasting in 1986, and founded the television channel HHC. In 1992, Hamraoui was appointed Minister of Culture under the government of Ali Kafi. As minister, he kickstarted the restoration of Palais des Rais and the National Museum of Fine Arts of Algiers. He also controversially supported public raï festivals despite Islamist threats. He held the position until 1994.

Between 1997 and 1998, Hamraoui was the Algerian Minister of Communication. He founded the Algerian Agency for Cultural Outreach, which conducted Algeria's diaspora affairs. In 1997, Hamraoui rebuffed the Committee to Protect Journalists' accusations that the Algerian government detained journalists critical of the government. Under Hamraoui's rule, Algeria cracked down on the foreign press, and the CPJ noted that Algerian journalists would self-censor to avoid being detained.

In 1997, Hamraoui became president of Algerian national television (ENTV). He was a close confidant of President Abdelaziz Bouteflika and this was heavily reflected in ENTV's reporting, so much so the channel was colloquially called Canal Boutef. In 2007, after an Al-Qaeda in the Islamic Maghreb attack killed 41 people, Al Jazeera released an online poll asking "Do you support al-Qaeda's attacks in Algeria?" which 50% of respondents voted yes. Hamraoui criticized Al Jazeera, and said that the poll was a justification for terrorist acts.

In 2009, Hamraoui was appointed Algerian ambassador to Romania. In 2013, he helped negotiate a deal with Algeria and Austrian oil company OMV. In 2013, during the In Amenas hostage crisis, Hamraoui expressed his condolences for the Romanians killed in the attack but contradicted the Romanian government's claims.

In the Hirak protests in 2019, Hamraoui supported Bouteflika.
