= Habib Reda =

- Born: Mohamed Hattab; March 28, 1919; Miliana, French Algeria
- Died: 2013; Algiers, Algeria
- Other names: Habib Réda
- Citizenship: Algerian
- Occupation(s): Actor, musician, composer
- Notable work: Kenzi (Mon trésor) (1948); Z (1969)

Habib Reda (born Mohamed Hattab; March 28, 1919 – 2013) was an Algerian actor, musician, and composer. Known for his participation in early film productions before independence and later appeared in international cinema, with his participation in the political film Z (1969) directed by Costa-Gavras.

== Biography ==
Mohamed Hattab, known professionally as Habib Réda, was born on March 28, 1919, in Miliana (present-day Aïn Defla Province), Algeria.

He appeared in several films shot from the 1940s onwards, notably Kenzi (Mon trésor) in 1948, and also took part in international productions such as Z (1969).

In 1955, he joined the Algerian War of Independence. He became one of the officials of the Autonomous Zone of Algiers and participated in armed resistance activities, including bomb placements. Arrested in 1957, he was sentenced to death and imprisoned at the Sarrouy School, where he was subjected to torture.

He also worked as a film composer and performer, credited for the music in Kenzi (Mon trésor). Reda remained active in North African cinema after World War II and occasionally collaborated on international productions through the 1960s and 1970s.

He died in 2013 at the age of 94 in Algiers and was buried at El Kettar Cemetery.

== Filmography ==
- Children of Destiny (1946) — actor credit.
- Kenzi (Mon trésor) (1947/1948) — actor and composer credit (music by Habib Reda).
- Z (1969) — actor credit in the international cast of Costa-Gavras’ film.
- The Legacy (1975) — listed in databases (MUBI).

== Discography ==
- Composer credit for Kenzi (Mon trésor).
- Early recordings from the 1940s are referenced in indexes of Maghrebi popular music and in online audio compilations such as Habib Réda (1940s) playlists.

== Legacy ==
Habib Réda is recognized in North African film directories as an early figure in Maghrebi sound cinema and among the first generation of Algerian actors who transitioned from theatre to film. His appearance in the political thriller Z (1969) also granted him recognition in international cinema.
