= Habib Tawa =

French historian, journalist and mathematician

Habib Tawa (born 31 October 1945, in Tripoli, Lebanon) is a French historian, journalist and mathematician.

== Biography ==
His doctoral thesis in history, under the joint supervision of the EHESS and the Paris-Sorbonne University, focused on contemporary Egypt, while his thesis in mathematics, argued at the University of Paris-Sud, was devoted to linear algebra. Thereafter, he turned his research and publications on the history of religion (Samaritans, Yezidis etc.), on contemporary Middle East and Central and East Asia. He is known to be a great connoisseur on issues related to the Syrian-Lebanese emigration in Egypt that occurred from the middle of the 19th.

In 2001 he was entrusted the responsibility of chronicling geopolitics in the monthly Afrique-Asie.

Habib Tawa is secretary to several scientific societies (Société d'études samaritaines 1995–2008, Société des amis des manuscrits et études karaïtes since 1995) and member of the Société Asiatique and the Société mathématique de France.

== Bibliography ==
- « Liban : un centre lesté par sa périphérie », in Le centre et la périphérie, colloque au Collège de France with the CNRS and the Société asiatique, Jean Maisonneuve, 2009, 14 p.
- « Alexandrie à Beyrouth, d'une société multiculturelle à une société multiconfessionnelle », in Alexandrie et la Méditerranée : entre histoire et mémoire (Actes du colloque international Histoire et mémoire à la Bibliotheca Alexandrina), Maisonneuve & Larose, 2006, 13 p.
- « Le système communautaire au Liban, dernier survivant ou modèle d'avenir ? » in Actes d’un colloque international à la Bibliotheca Alexandrina, ETS Pisa et Vrin, Paris, 2004, 42 p.
- « Les Yézidis », in Revue des anciens de l’Inalco, Paris, 2001, 25 p.
- « Traces de l’Israël éthiopien au travers des principaux géographes arabes du Moyen âge », in Noblesse oblige, in honour of David Kessler, Vallentine Mitchel, London, Portland Oregon, 1998, 14 p.
- « Sur quelques traces d’influences samaritaines au sein de l’islam », in New Samaritan Studies, vol. III et IV, University of Sydney, 1995, 15 p.
- « Aspects historiques de la question de la science face au racisme », in Racisme, science et pseudo-science, actes du colloque réuni en vue de l'examen critique des différentes théories pseudo-scientifiques invoquées pour justifier le racisme et la discrimination raciale, Athènes, 30 March - 3 April 1981, Unesco (translated into English and Spanish), 1982, 16 p.
- « La violence politique marginalisée en Afrique sub-saharienne », in Terrorisme et culture, Paris-Sorbonne University, vol. II, cahier 20, 1981, 23 pages.
- Théorie des espaces vectoriels à dimension finie relative (Positive, Négative), thèse de doctorat in mathematic, Université Paris-Sud, 1979, 120 p.
- Imbrication entre pouvoir, mouvements politiques et armée en Égypte de la guerre de Palestine à la chute de la monarchie (1948–1952), thèse de doctorat en histoire, EHESS and Université Paris IV-Sorbonne, Paris, 1977, 483 p.
