= Habiba =

Habiba (Arabic: حَبِيْبَه, ḥabībah), alternatively Habibah and Habeeba, is a female given name of Arabic origin meaning beloved, sweetheart, or lover, stemming from the male name Habib.

Habiba or Habibah may refer to:

== People ==
- Habiba of Valencia (also known as Thoma; died 1127), Arab Andalusian scholar
- Habiba bint Jahsh, a companion of the Islamic prophet, Muhammad
- Gogo Habiba, Fulani noblewoman
- Habiba Mohamed Ahmed Alymohmed (born 1999), Egyptian squash player
- Habiba Zehi Ben Romdhane (born 1950), Tunisian minister
- Habiba Bouhamed Chaabouni, Tunisian Professor of Medical Genetics
- Habiba Dembélé, Ivorian journalist
- Habiba Djahnine (born 1968), Algerian film producer
- Habiba Ghribi (born 1984), Tunisian athlete
- Habiba Nosheen (born 1982), Pakistani-Canadian journalist
- Habiba Ahmed Abd Elaziz Ramadan (1986–2013), Egyptian journalist and activist
- Habiba Sarābi (born 1956), Afghan physician
- Habibah binte Ubayd-Allah, a companion of the Islamic prophet, Muhammad
- Habibah bint Kharijah ibn Zayd ibn Abi Zuhayr, wife of Abu Bakr, the first Muslim Caliph following Muhammad's death
- Umm Habiba (or Ramla bint Abi Sufyan; c.594–666), a wife of Muhammad

== Other uses ==
- Hassan and Habibah, British television presenters
- Habibas Islands, located just north of the Algerian coast
