= Habib Boukhreis =

Sahrawi diplomat

Habib Mahfud Boukhreis
- حبيب محفوظ بوخريص

Sahrawi Ambassador to Uganda
- In office 5 June 2010 – 7 May 2019
- Prime Minister: Abdelkader Taleb Omar
- Succeeded by: Mohamed Bachir Al-Wali

Sahrawi Ambassador to Madagascar
- In office 1997 – 4 July 2005
- Prime Minister: Mahfoud Ali Beiba; Bouchraya Hammoudi Bayoun; Abdelkader Taleb Omar

Personal details
- Party: Polisario Front
- Occupation: Diplomat

Habib Mahfud A. Boukhreis is a member of the Sahrawi National Secretariat and the Pan-African Parliament. He formerly served as the Sahrawi ambassador to Uganda, also accredited non-resident ambassador to Rwanda, with a base in Kampala.

== Diplomatic postings ==
In 1997, Boukhreis was the Sahrawi ambassador in Madagascar, with a base in Antananarivo. On May 6, 1997, he presented his letter of credentials to Albert René, as extraordinary and plenipotentiary non-resident ambassador to the Republic of Seychelles. On June that year, he was also accredited as non-resident ambassador to the Republic of Mauritius.

In 2008, he was appointed as ambassador in charge of International Forums, representing the SADR in some events, as the 13th African Union Summit of Heads of States and Governments of Africa held at Sirte, Libya. On June 5, 2010, Boukhreis presented his credentials to Ugandan President Yoweri Museveni, with another eleven envoyees, as Sahrawi resident ambassador. On December 6, 2011, he also presented his credentials to Rwandan President Paul Kagame.
