= Al-Masilah =

Coordinates: 15°58′N 49°00′E

- Interactive map of Al-Masilah
- Country: Yemen
- Governorate: Hadhramaut
- Time zone: UTC+3 (Yemen Standard Time)

Al-Masilah is a village in eastern Yemen. It is located in the Hadhramaut Governorate.
