= Habib Zabalawi =

Jordanian journalist

Habib Saeed Zabalawi is a Jordanian journalist who works at BeIN Sports since 2013 and a FIFA Players Agent Since 2010.

== Professional career ==
- Abu Dhabi Sports – Producer (November 2008 - December 2012)
- Jordan Broadcasting Television (ATV) – Senior Producer / Presenter (August 2006 - November 2007)
- Arab Radio And Television (ART) - International Sport Reporter (March 2005 - August 2006)
- Al Arabiya Satellite Channel (MBC Group) – Sport Correspondent (February 2003 - March 2005)
- Jordan Motorsport – Official Announcer And Commentator In Jordan (Jordan International Rally - Jordan National Rally)(February 2007 - August 2008)
- Super Sport Magazine - Sports Reporter In Jordan (January 2004 - August 2008)
- Director of Media and Communication at Al-Hussein (2026)

== Awards ==
- Best Arab Sports Reporter For The Year 2004 And The Year 2005 And 2006.
- Prize From Princess Sumayya Bint Al Hassan For Being The Best Sports Reporter In Jordan (2004)
- The Best Coverage For F1 Races Between All right Holders Channels In 2010 By FIA.
