= Mahbuba (singer) =

Mahbuba was a 9th-century slave entertainer in the Abbasid Caliphate.
