= Habib Touhami =

Tunisian politician (1948–2026)

- الحبيب التوهامي

Minister of Health
- In office 14 October 1983 – 20 January 1984
- Preceded by: Rachid Sfar
- Succeeded by: Souad Lyagoubi

Personal details
- Born: 2 May 1948 Kébili, French protectorate of Tunisia
- Died: 20 June 2026 (aged 78) Tunis, Tunisia
- Party: Socialist Destourian Party
- Occupation: Politician

Habib Touhami (Arabic: الحبيب التوهامي; 2 May 1948 – 20 June 2026) was a Tunisian politician who served as Minister of Health from 1983 to 1984.

== Death ==
Touhami died in Tunis on 20 June 2026, at the age of 78.
