= Mahbub Alam (journalist) =

Indian journalist and publisher

Mahbub (or Mahboob) Alam (1863-1933) was an Indian journalist and publisher who lived in Gujranwala. He was a pioneer in South Asian journalism, and in 1888 he founded the daily newspaper Paisa Akhbar (Penny Newspaper), which covered political and social news.
