= Dhaka University Debating Society =

Bangladeshi competitive debating society

- Abbreviation: DUDS (ডিইউডিএস)
- Formation: 17 October 1982; 44 years ago
- Type: Students' Debating Organization
- Legal status: Registered
- Purpose: Producing Debaters, Democratic Movement, Organizing and Participating in National & International Debating Events
- Location: 2nd Floor, 212, Teachers-Students center, Dhaka University, Dhaka, Bangladesh
- Coordinates: 23°43′52″N 90°23′46″W
- Region served: Bangladesh
- Members: For the Students of Dhaka University
- Official language: Bengali, English
- Vice-Chancellor: A B M Obaidul Islam
- President: Mahbubur Rahman Masum
- General Secretary: Fouad Hosen
- Main organ: Executive Council (33 Members)
- Affiliations: Dhaka University Senate
- Budget: Allocated from Dhaka University
- Staff: Main Committee 33, Associate Organizations of more than 50
- Volunteers: About 1000
- Website: www.debate-duds.org

Dhaka University Debating Society (DUDS, ডি.ইউ.ডি.এস.), is a student organization that is connected with the Bangladesh debate movement. According to the full guideline of Dhaka University authority, this organization works to spread debate among the students of Dhaka University. DUDS is economically supported by the senate of Dhaka University.

== Executive committee ==
Date	President	General secretary/secretary-general.
1982–1990	Dr. Begum Jahanara and several other teachers	-
1990-1992	Mohammad Niamot Ali Elahi	Hasan Ahmed Chowdury
1992-1994	Hasan Ahmed Chowdury	Shameem Reza and Soid Asifur Rahman
1994–1996	A.K.M Shoyeb	Newaj Khalid Ahmed
1996–1997	Mohammad Anis	Rathindranath Datta
1997–1998	Tanzibul Alam	Munir Uddin Ahmed
1998–1999	Hazrat Khan	Sonjoy Majumder
1999–2000	S.M. Tariqul Islam	Shaikh Imtiaj
2000–2001	Abdul Wahab Setu	Amit Dash Gupto
2001–2002	Bulbul Hasan	Khademul Karim Iqbal
2002–2003	Khademul Karim Iqbal	Nazmul Huda Sumon
2003-2003	Devashis Kundu Kakan and Mahmud Alam Bappi	Khayrul Bashar Shohel and Sanjib Saha
2004–2005	Mehedi Hasan Tamim	Abdur Rahim
2005–2006	Arif Al Mamun and Abdur Rahim	Rashedul Alam Rasel
2006–2007	Rashedul Alam Rasel	Kamrul Islam
2007–2008	Tahmid Alam Amit	Md. Ziul Haque Sheikh
2008–2009	Moffazzal Hossen Sumon	Mozammal Hossain Sikto
2009–2010	AL-Amin Chodhury Sumon	Md. Rakibul Islam
2010–2011	Syed Arif Hossen Ashik and Shahadat Hosen Roni	Asad Azim and Nazmul Islam Shovon
2011–2012	Riasad Azim	Iqbal Hosen
2012–2013	Toufiqil Islam	Rokibul Hasan
2013–2014	Shamima Akter Jahan Popy	Mohammad Shoaib
2014–2015	G.M Arifuzzaman	Abu Rayhan
2016-2017	Raihan Shanon	Mazharul Kabir Shayon
2017- 2018	Mahmud Abdullah Bin Munshi and Abu Bakkar Siddique Prince	Abdullah Al Noman
2018-2019	S M Rakib Sirazy	Abdullah Al Asad
2019-2021	S M Abdullah Al Faisal	Md. Yeasin Arafat & Jahid Hossain
2021-2022	Sheikh Mohammad Arman	Maksuda Akter Toma
2022-2023	Md Mahbubur Rahman Masum	Fouad Hosen
2023-2024	Arpita Golder	Adnan Mustary
2024-25	Jubaer Hossen Shahed	Ragib Anjum

== Activities ==
- National Debate Festival
- Nafia Gazi inter-department debate competition
- Inter-university Bengali debate competition
- Inter-university English debate competition
- Inter-college Bengali/English debate competition
- Inter-school Bengali/English debate competition
- Inter-dormitory Bengali debate competition
- Inter-dormitory English debate competition
- Publication
- Study circle
- Seminar
- Workshop
- Participation in National and international debating competition
- Celebration of special days and Exhibition debate

== Associate organisations ==
=== Hall debating clubs ===
- Ekushe Debating Club
- F H Hall Debating Club
- F Rahnan Hall Debating Club
- Kabi Jashim Uddin Hall Debating Club
- Bangabandhu Hall Debating Club(BHDC)
- Zia Hall Debating Club
- Begum Fazilatunnessa Debating Club
- Debate is a Debaters' Organization-Jagannath Hall
- Maitree Debating Club
- Mohsin Hall Debating Club
- Rokeya Bitorko Angan
- Shamsunnahar Hall Debating Club
- Shahidullah Hall Debating Club
- Sufia Kamal Hall Debating Club
- Surjo Sen Bitorko Dhara
- Salimullah Muslim Hall Debating Club
- House of Debaters-Sergeant Jahurul Haque Hall
- Bijoy Ekattor Hall Debating Club

== Divisions/Department debating clubs ==
- World Religions Debating Club, University of Dhaka
- Accounting debating club
- IER debating club
- C.S.C. D.U. debating club
- Anthropology debating club
- Political Science Debating Club
- Physics debating club
- Population sciences debating club
- EconDU Debate Wing
- and others

=== Institution debating clubs ===
- IIT debating club
- Socialwelfare debating club
- I.N.F.S. debating club
- Leather Technology institute debating club
- Health economics debating club

== Membership and registration ==
Any student of Dhaka University can be a member of DUDS according to the nature of this organization. They can join in English and Bengali sessions every week. Generally members are recruited at the start of the year. Members can be registered from different hall debating clubs or associated organizations.

== Moderator panel ==
- Vice Chancellor- A B M Obaidul Islam
- Chief moderator - Mahbuba Nasreen
- Moderators - Prof. SM Shamim Reza, Prof. Shamsad Nowreen, Prof Tawhida Jahan

== Publication ==
Every year, DUDS publishes two annual publications, Protibak and Prottus for members. Commemorative books of the national debate festival are also published and some others publications.
