= Asia Pacific Alliance for Disaster Management =

Non-profit organization headquartered in Japan

The Asia Pacific Alliance for Disaster Management (A-PAD) is a non-profit organization headquartered in Japan. Its mission is to "facilitate collaboration amongst the member countries for the purpose of delivering effective and efficient disaster assistance through disaster preparedness, risk reduction, relief and recovery."

== Background ==
In September 2011, the Asia Pacific Relief Summit was held in Tokyo, Japan where humanitarian aid actors from five countries agreed to create an action framework for times of disaster. Based on this framework, a new organization was founded named the Asia Pacific Alliance for Disaster Management. The establishment of the Alliance was announced at the 5th Asian Ministerial Conference on Disaster Risk Reduction in October 2012 in Yogyakarta, Indonesia. On February 28, 2023, A-PAD marked its 10-year anniversary, hosting an international forum in Tokyo, Japan.

== Main activities ==
In each member country, A-PAD establishes a multi-sectoral network including governmental entities, private companies, and non-governmental organizations (NGOs) to build cooperation and plan the delivery of disaster assistance. Through these networks, or "platforms," A-PAD implements the following core activities:

- Disaster risk reduction (DRR): Build the capacity of communities, vulnerable subgroups, and emergency workers through:
  - training exercises and workshops
  - organizing forums/conferences
  - conducting public awareness campaigns and fundraising
- Emergency relief and recovery activities
  - Search-and-rescue operations
  - Provide food, non-food items, and emergency services to victims
  - Evacuation center management
  - Support NGOs that provide localized assistance including mental health support, community revitalization, and education assistance

== National platforms ==
- Bangladesh
- Indonesia
- Japan (merged with Civic Force)
- Nepal
- Philippines
- South Korea
- Sri Lanka
