= 2023 G20 New Delhi summit =

Summit of the leaders of all G20 member nations in New Delhi, India

2023 G20 New Delhi summit 18th G20 Summit
- 9–10 September 2023
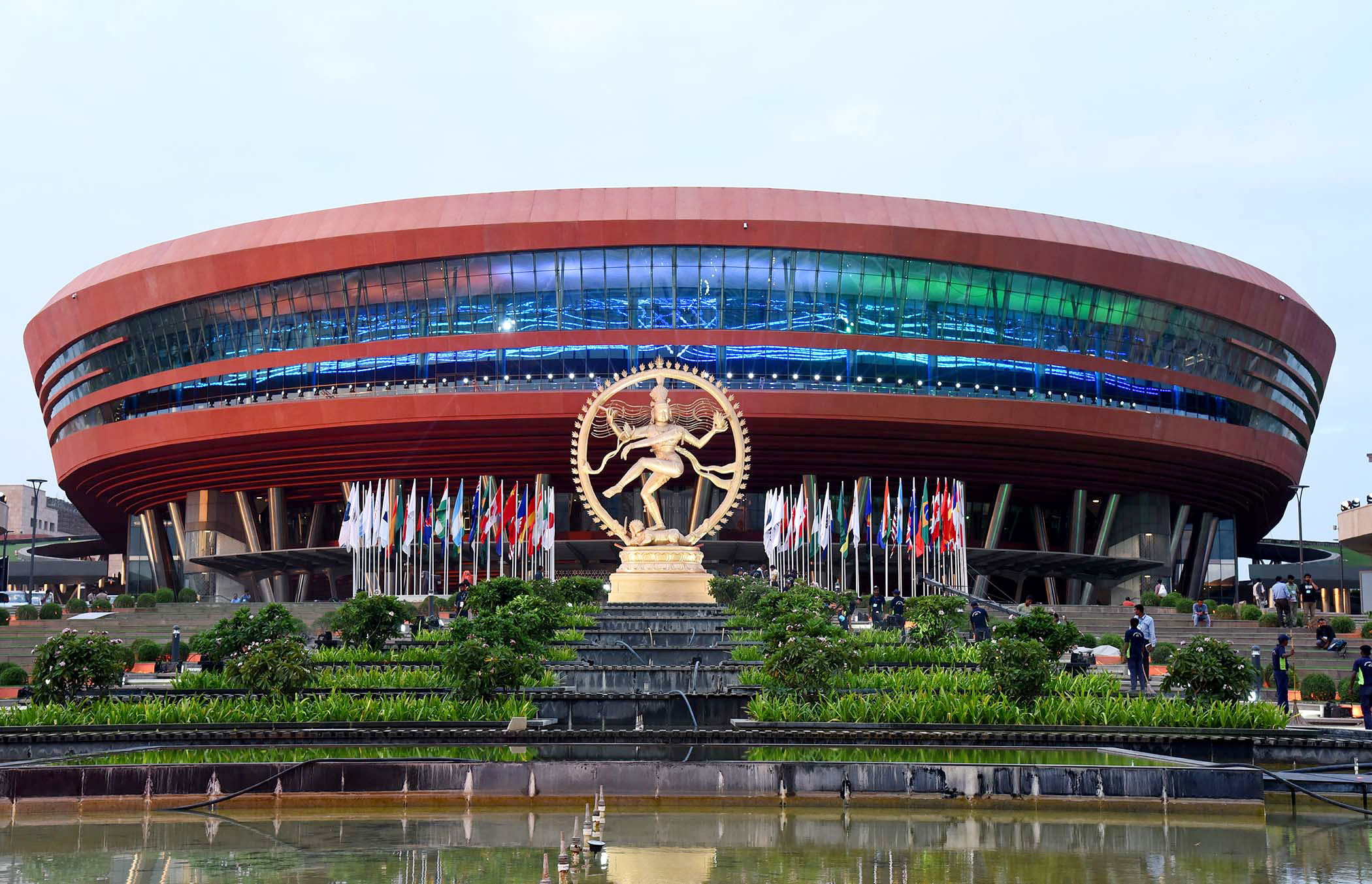
- Bharat Mandapam, Pragati Maidan (summit venue)
- Host country: India
- Motto: Vasudhaiva Kutumbakam (transl. One Earth, One Family, One Future) (Note: literally: 'The World Is One Family')
- Cities: New Delhi
- Venues: Bharat Mandapam, Pragati Maidan
- Participants: G20 members Guest invitees: Bangladesh, Egypt, Mauritius, Netherlands, Nigeria, Oman, Singapore, Spain, United Arab Emirates; Invited bodies: United Nations, African Union, CDRI, ISA, ADB, IMF, World Bank, WTO, WHO, ILO, FSB, OECD, AUDA-NEPAD, ASEAN
- Chair: Narendra Modi, Prime Minister of India
- Website: www.g20.in

The 2023 G20 New Delhi summit was the eighteenth meeting of the G20 (Group of Twenty), a Head of State and Government meeting held at Bharat Mandapam, Pragati Maidan, New Delhi on 9–10 September 2023. It was the first G20 summit held in India.

== Background ==
Originally, India was scheduled to host the G20 summit in 2021 and Italy in 2022. At the 2018 G20 Buenos Aires summit in Argentina, Prime Minister Narendra Modi said he had requested Italy to host the summit in 2021 and allow India to host it in 2022, on the occasion of the 75th year of India's independence. Italy agreed to let India host the G20 summit in 2022 in its place, owing to the momentum in bilateral ties.

However, after a request made by Indonesian Foreign Minister Retno Marsudi, India exchanged its presidency of the G20 with Indonesia because Indonesia would also chair the Association of Southeast Asian Nations (ASEAN) in 2023.

== Presidency ==
The G20 New Delhi Summit was chaired by the Indian Prime Minister, Narendra Modi. India's presidency began on 1 December 2022, leading up to the summit in the third quarter of 2023. The presidency handover ceremony was held, in which the G20 presidency gavel was transferred from Indonesian President Joko Widodo to Indian Prime Minister Modi at the close of the Bali summit. Indonesia held the presidency in 2022.

Indian Prime Minister Modi formally handed over the G20 presidency to Luiz Inácio Lula da Silva, the President of Brazil. India continued to hold the position until 30 November 2023.

== Agenda priorities ==
G20 India has put forth six agenda priorities for the G20 dialogue in 2023:

- Green Development, Climate Finance and Life
- Accelerated, Inclusive and Resilient Growth
- Accelerating progress on SDGs
- Technological Transformation and Digital Public Infrastructure
- Multilateral Institutions for the 21st century
- Women-led development

In an interview on 26 August 2023, Prime Minister Modi expressed optimism about the G20 countries' evolving agenda under India's presidency, shifting toward a human-centric development approach that aligns with the concerns of the Global South, including addressing climate change, debt restructuring through the G20's Common Framework for Debt, and a strategy for regulation of global cryptocurrencies.

== Preparations ==
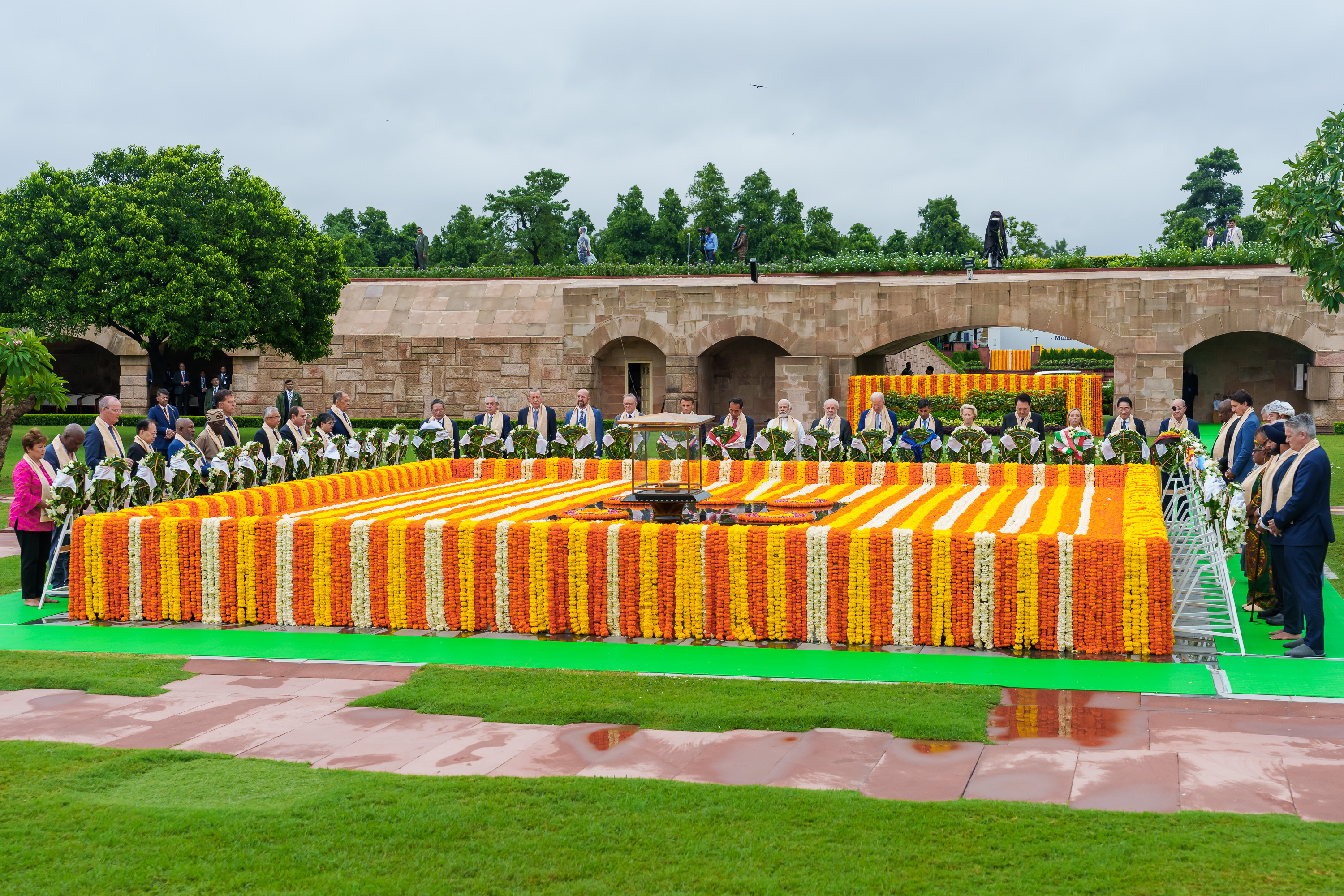
G20 leaders observing a moment of silence at Mahatma Gandhi memorial

The Government of India budgeted Rs. 990 crore (US$120 million) for the G20 events.

In the lead up to the G20 meeting, the Indian authorities, including the Archaeological Survey of India embarked on a mass demolition drive against homeless shelters and slum neighborhoods across New Delhi resulting in the eviction of its marginalized residents. Structures near the summit site were removed for being illegal, after giving residents time to vacate. Other demolitions occurred in areas far from the G20 venue, also following court orders. According to the 'Concerned Citizens' collective, this resulted in the displacement of an estimated 0.25 to 0.3 million people. In Delhi alone, almost 25 slums were bulldozed to the ground, including settlements in Yamuna Bank, Tughlaqabad and Mehrauli, among others.

In the days prior to the summit, the New Delhi Municipal Council (NDMC) placed life-size cutouts of langurs in several parts of the city to scare away the smaller rhesus macaque monkeys. The Municipal Corporation of Delhi rounded up almost 1,000 stray dogs and moved them to shelters in the run-up to the G20 summit.

For the security of the event, the government had deployed 130,000 security personnel, including 80,000 police officers from Delhi Police.

In the shutdown imposed on the 32 million people living in Delhi, all schools, offices, workplaces, marketplaces, restaurants and non-food shops were ordered to close for three days. Movement on the roads was also restricted, all food deliveries were restricted in areas under NDMC and people were recommended to stay at home.

== Participating leaders ==
The Russian President Vladimir Putin and CCP General Secretary Xi Jinping decided to skip the summit in the Indian capital. Their places were taken up by Russian foreign minister Sergey Lavrov and Chinese premier Li Qiang, respectively.

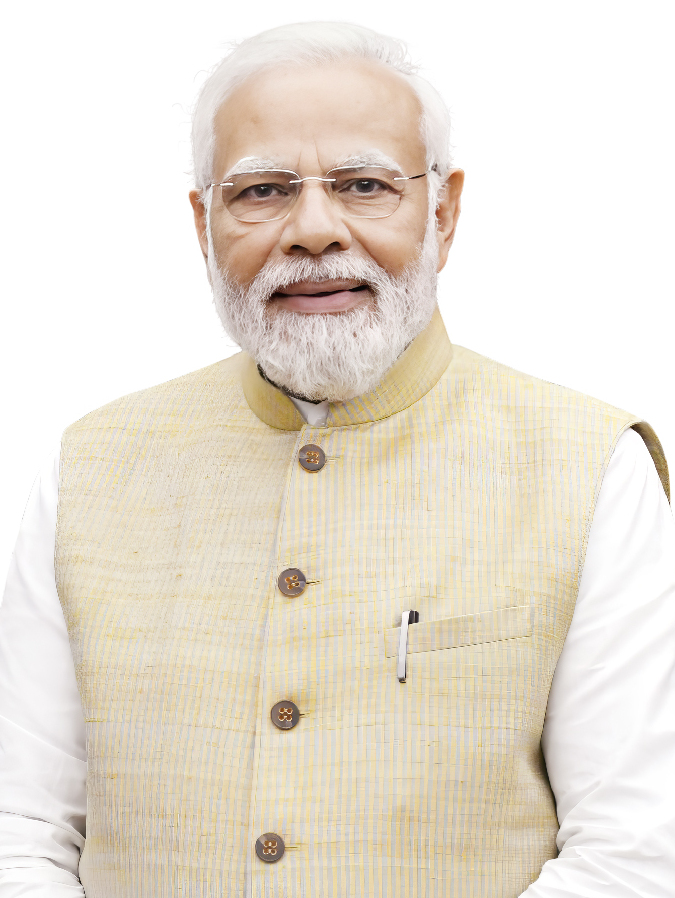
India
Narendra Modi, Prime Minister
(Host)

United States
Joe Biden, President

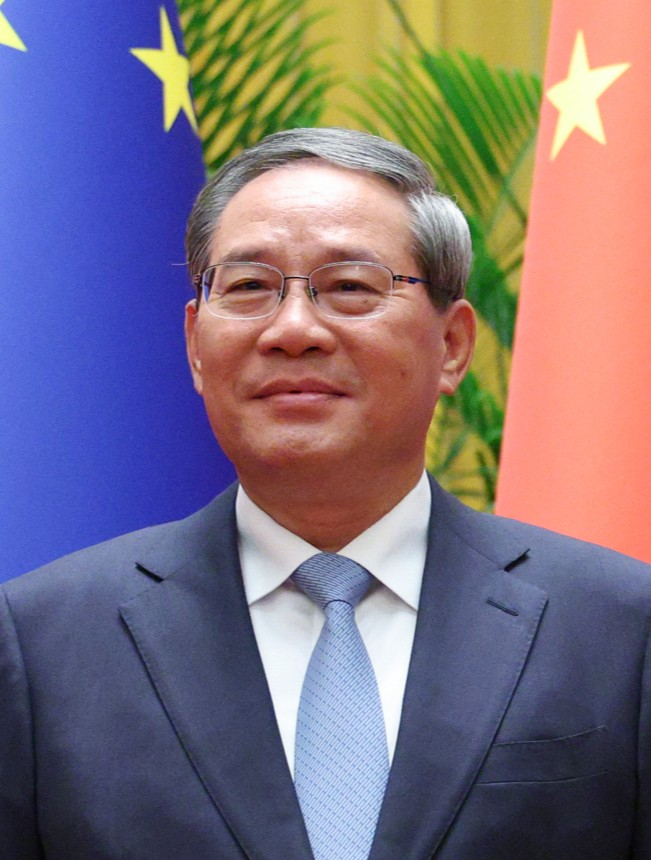
China
Li Qiang, Premier

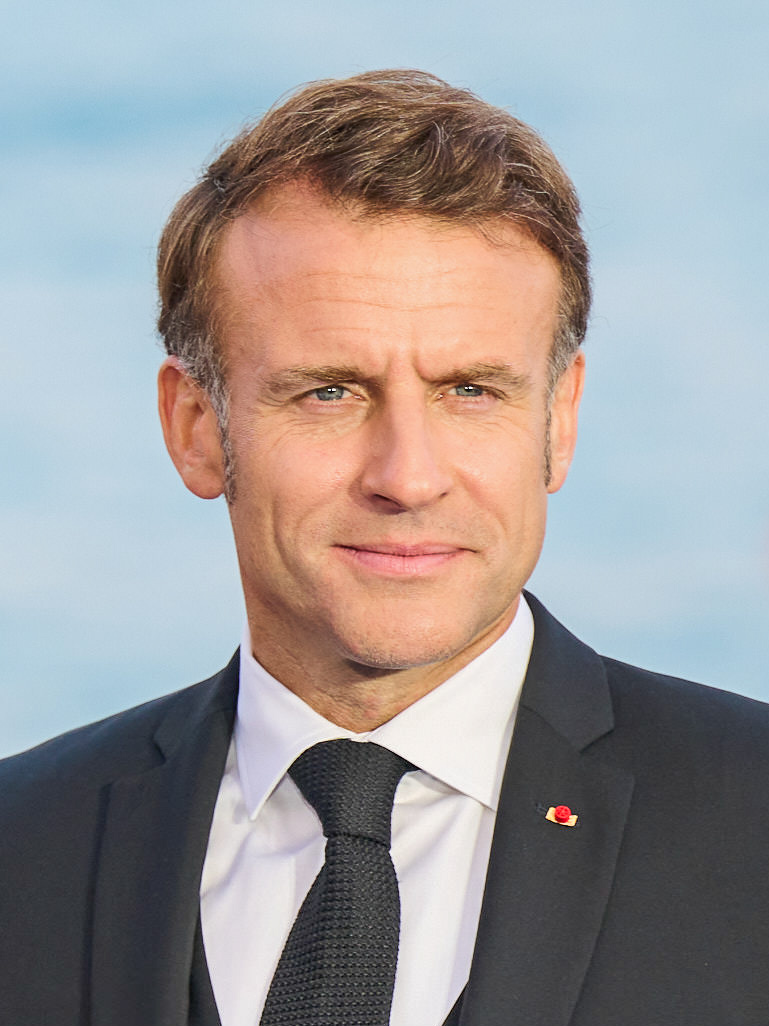
(France) France
Emmanuel Macron,
President

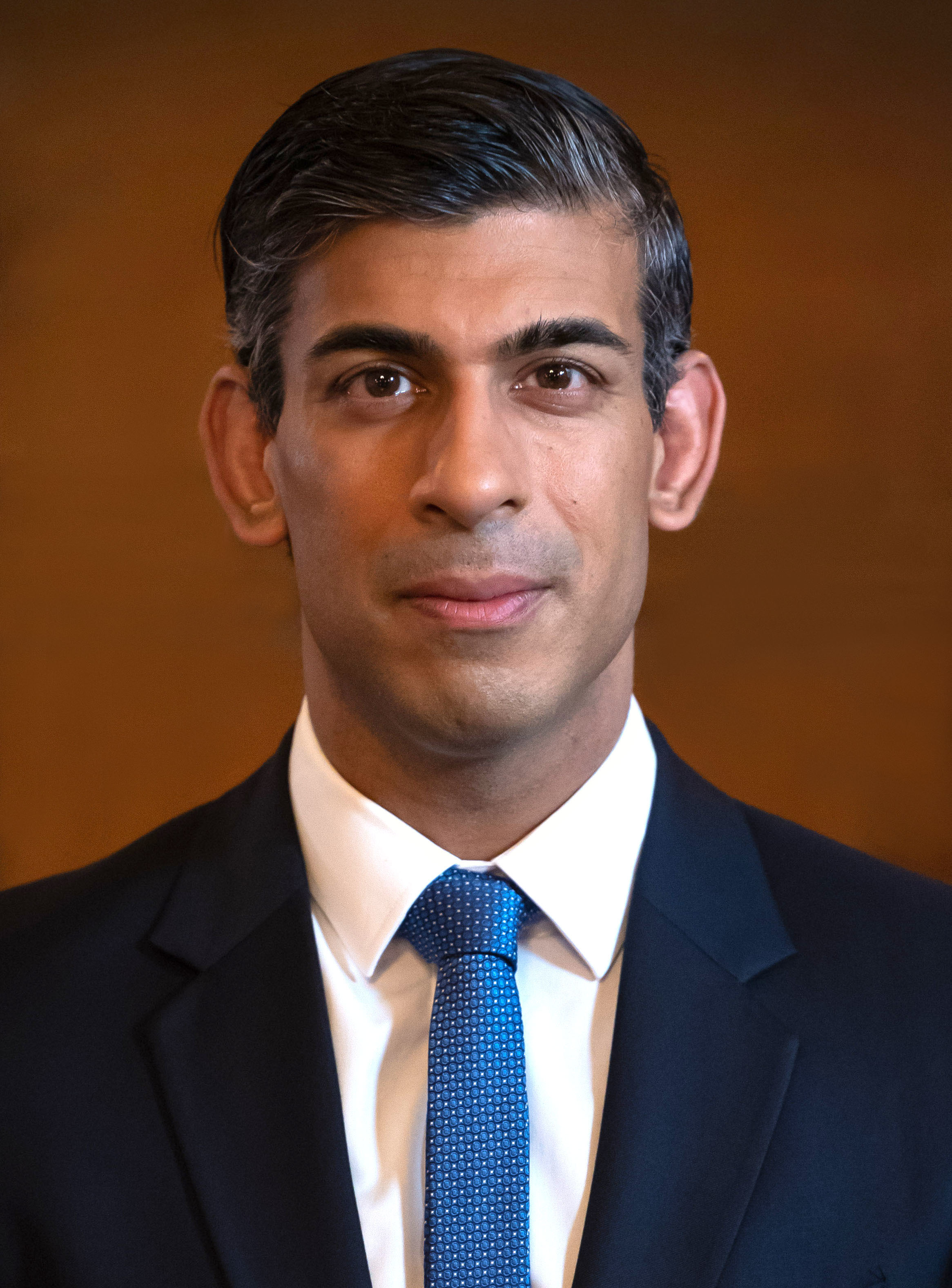
United Kingdom
Rishi Sunak, Prime Minister

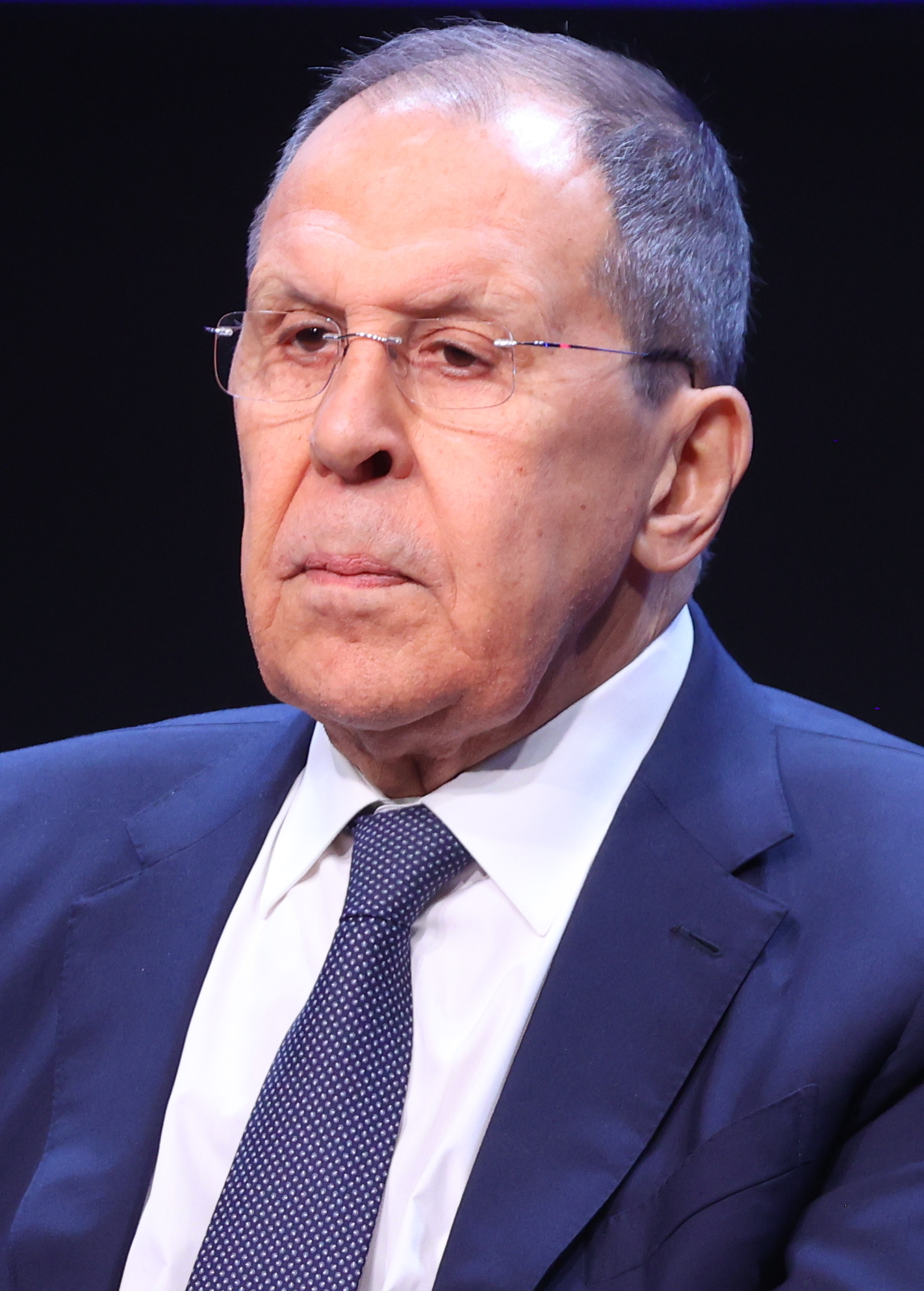
Russia
Sergey Lavrov, Foreign Minister

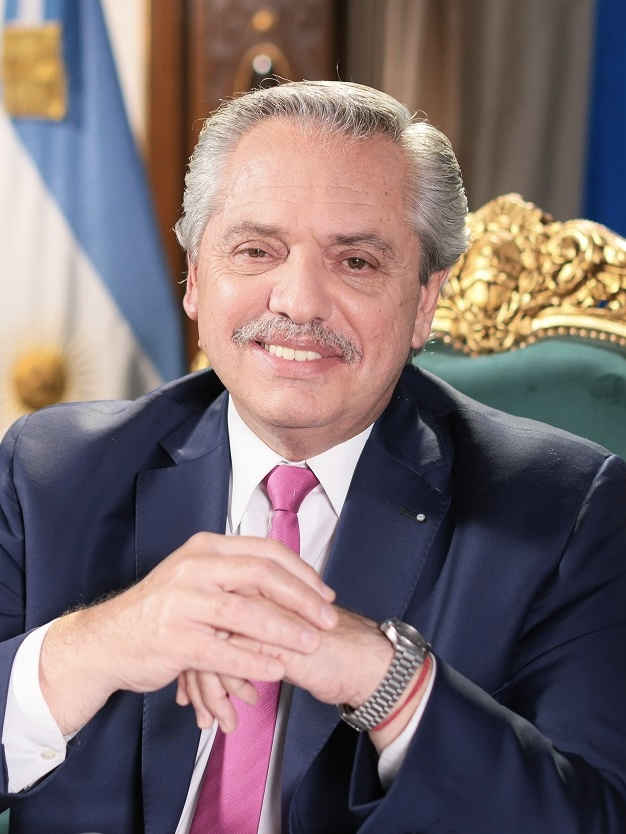
Argentina
Alberto Fernández, President

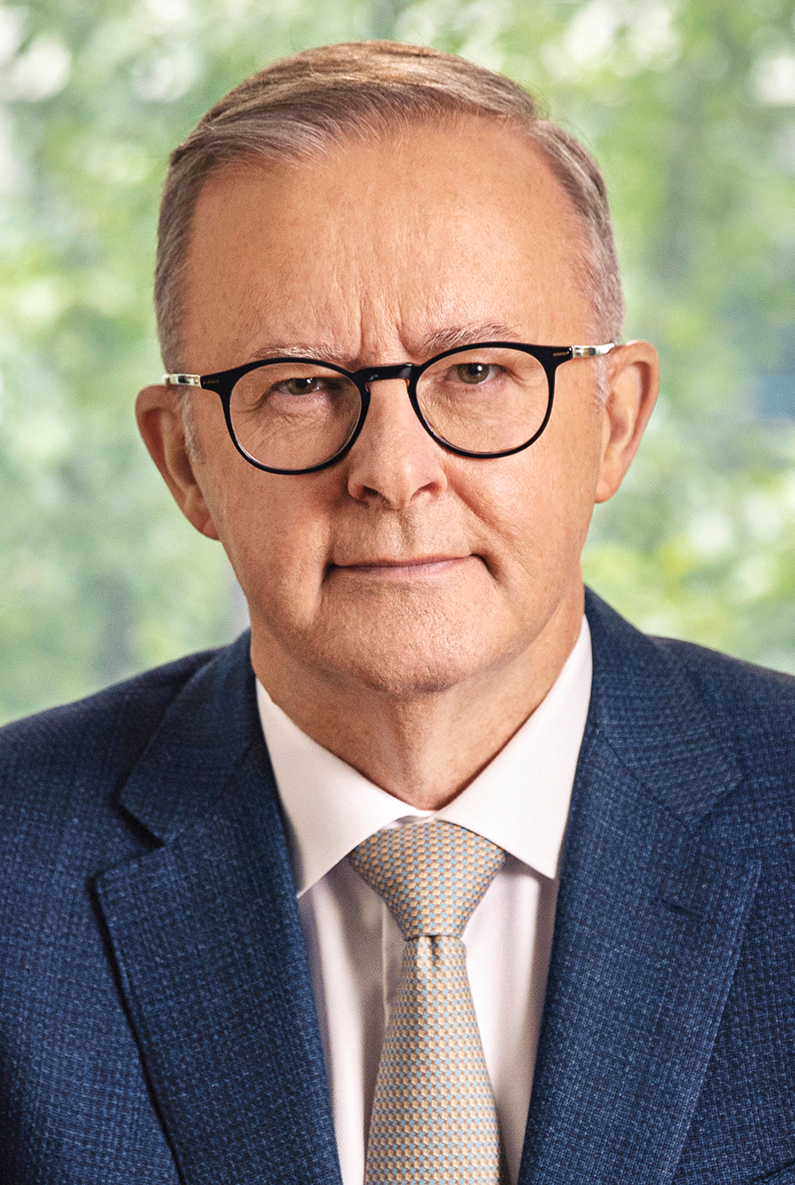
Australia
Anthony Albanese, Prime Minister

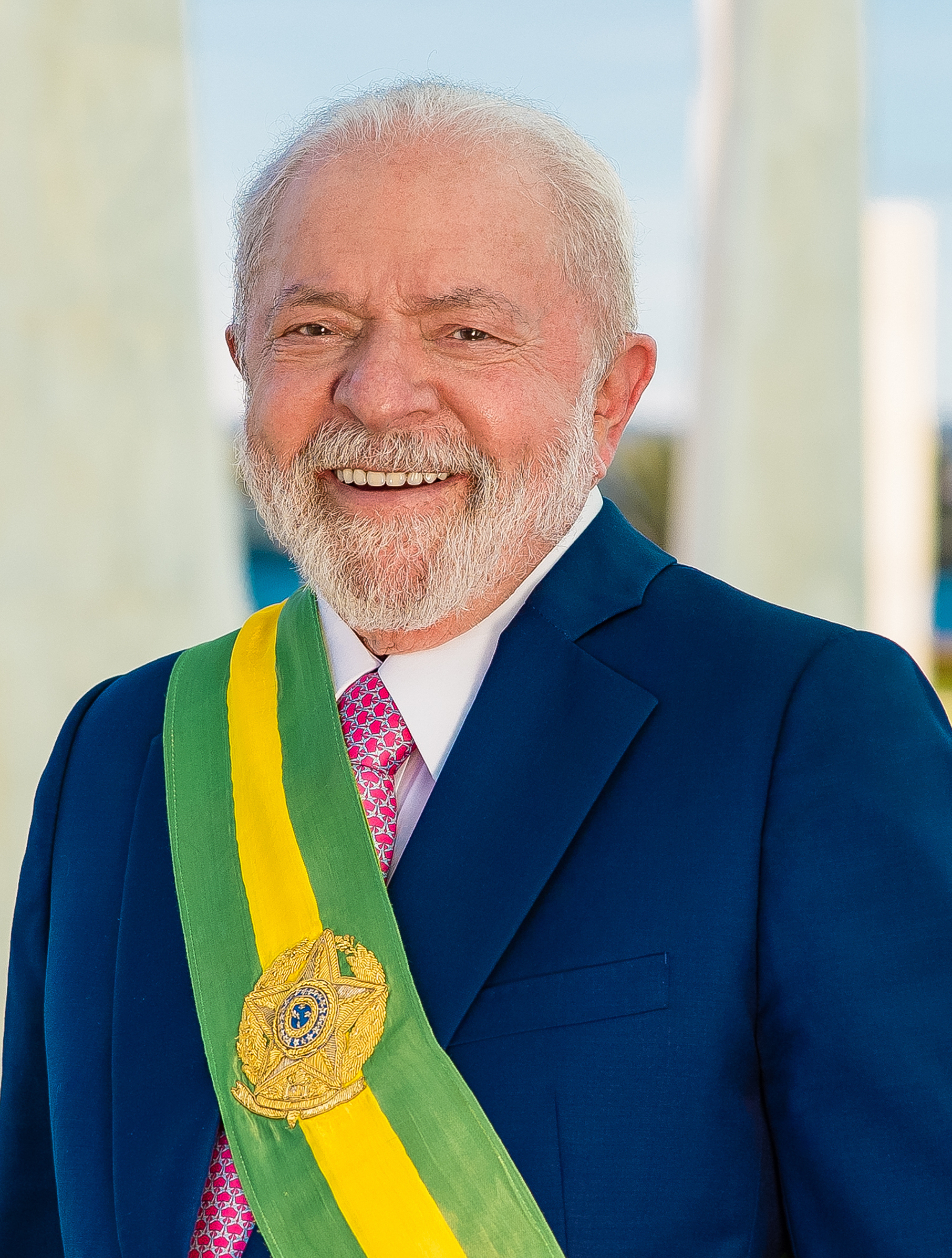
Brazil
Luiz Inácio Lula da Silva, President

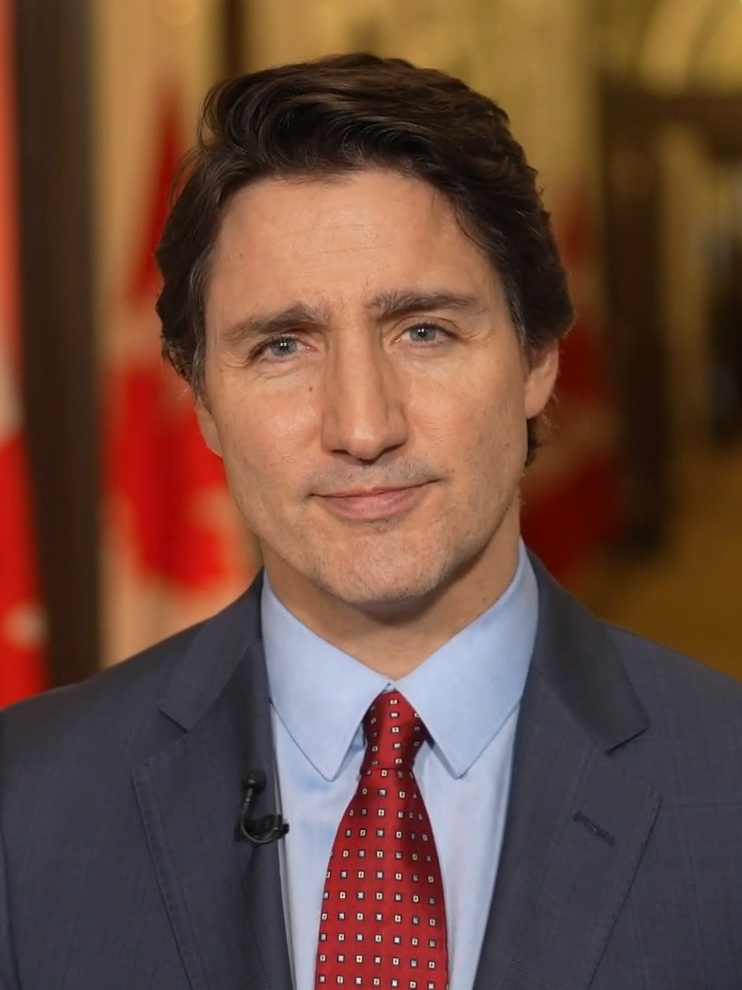
Canada
Justin Trudeau, Prime Minister

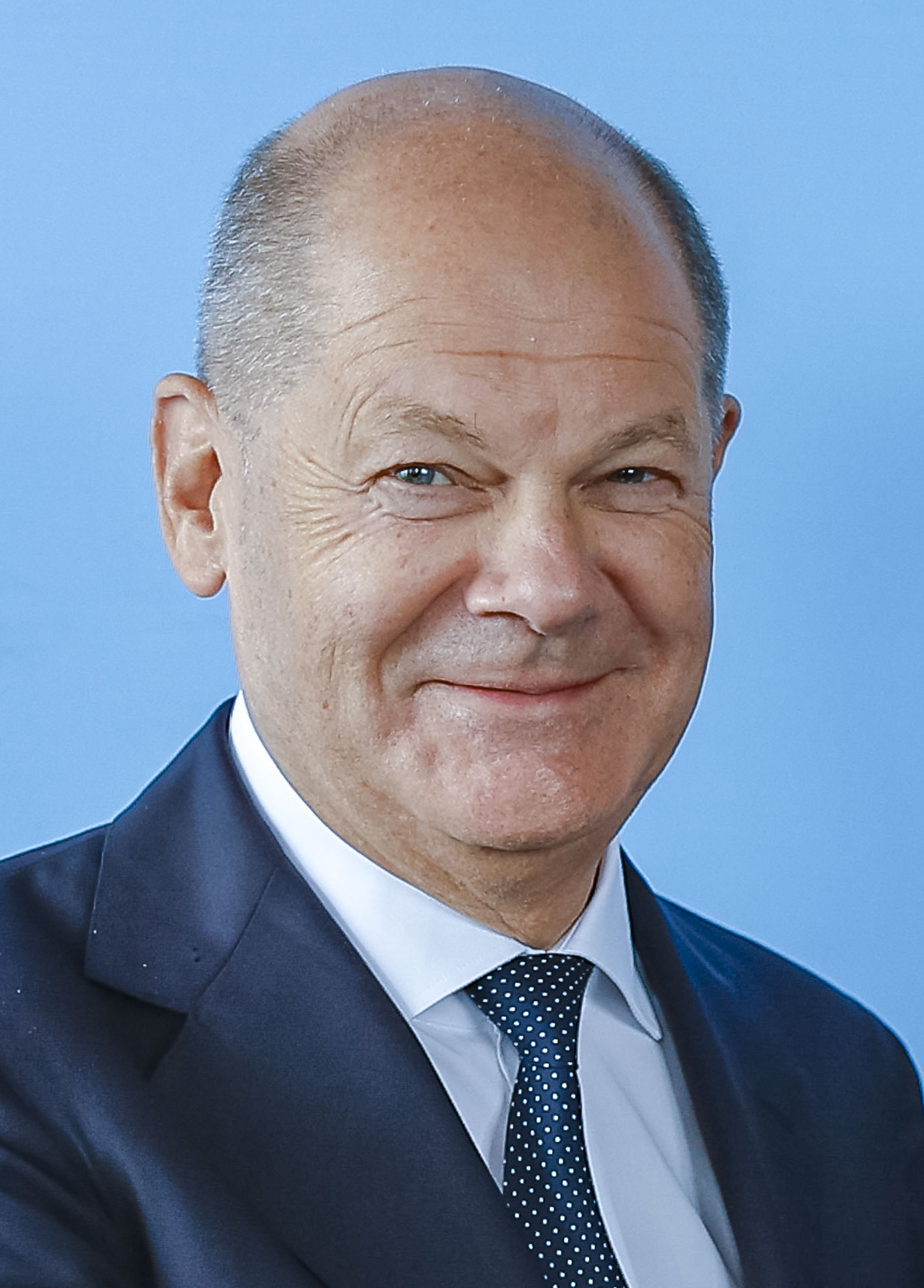
Germany
Olaf Scholz, Chancellor

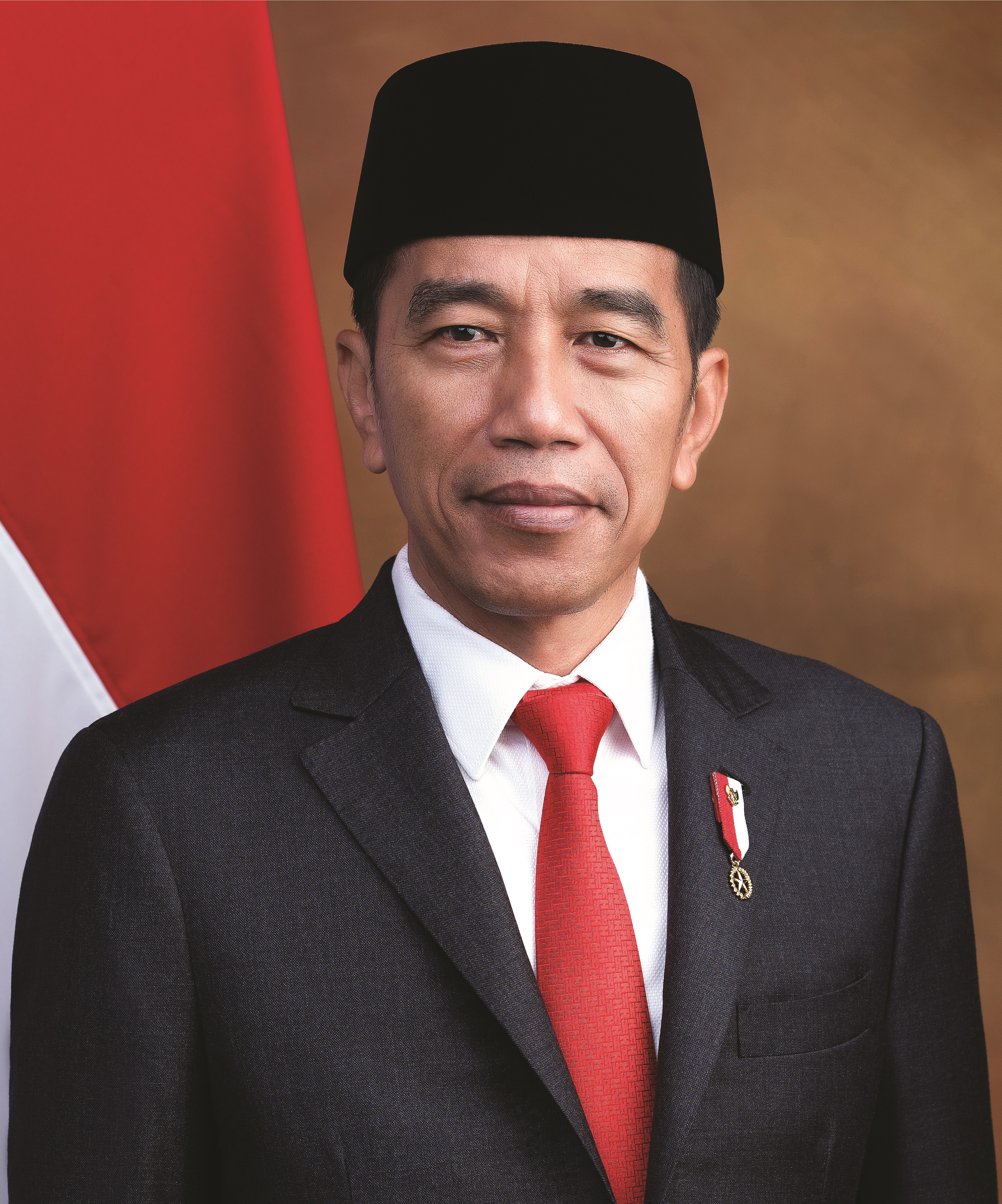
Indonesia
Joko Widodo, President,
2023 Chairperson of the Association of Southeast Asian Nations

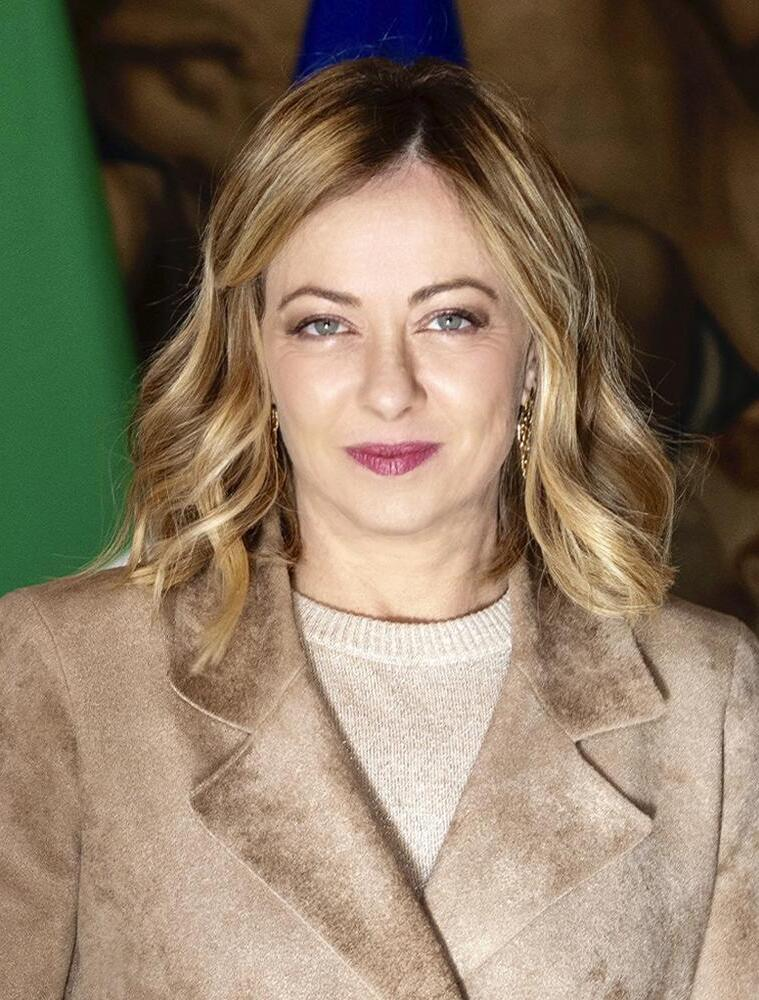
Italy
Giorgia Meloni, Prime Minister

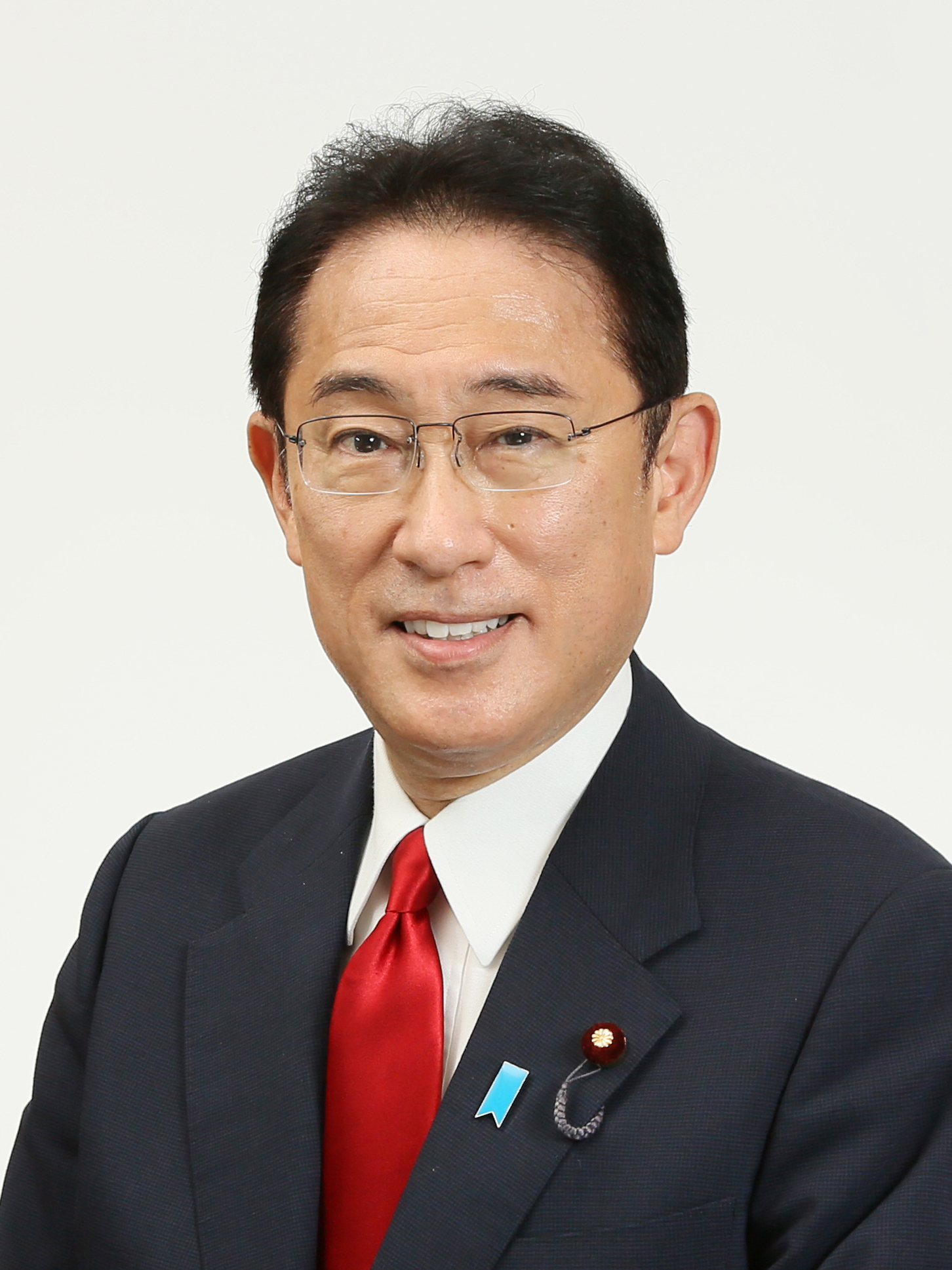
Japan
Fumio Kishida, Prime Minister

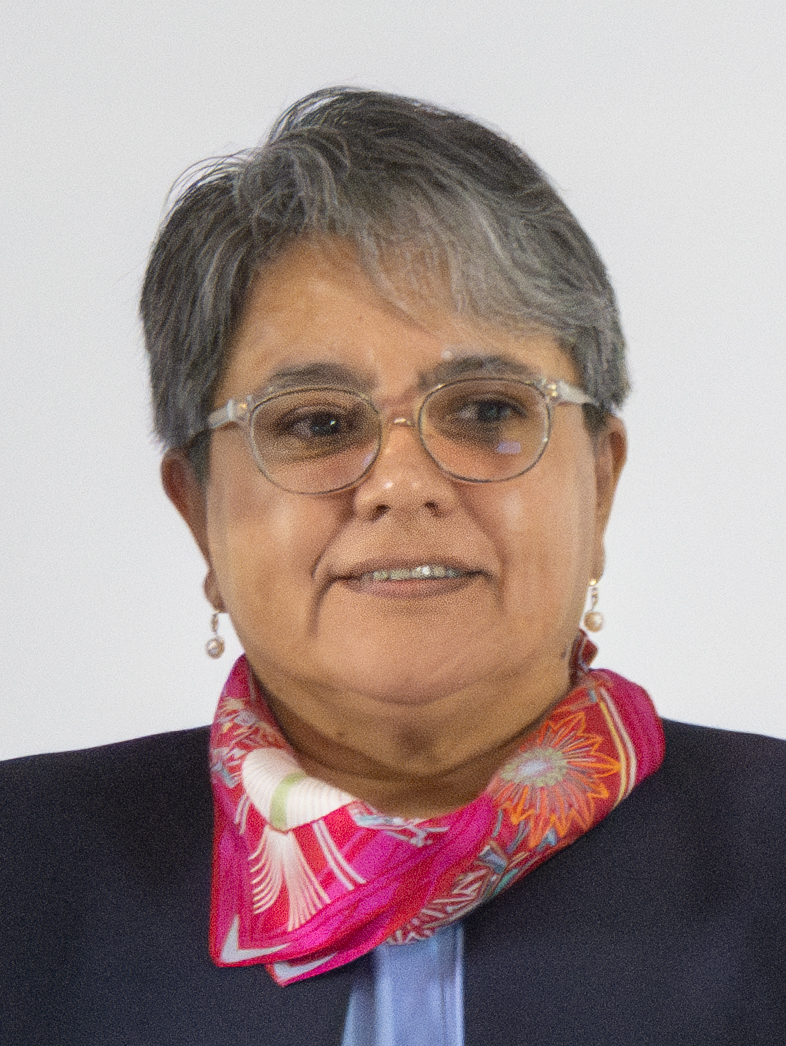
Mexico
Raquel Buenrostro Sánchez,
Minister of Economy

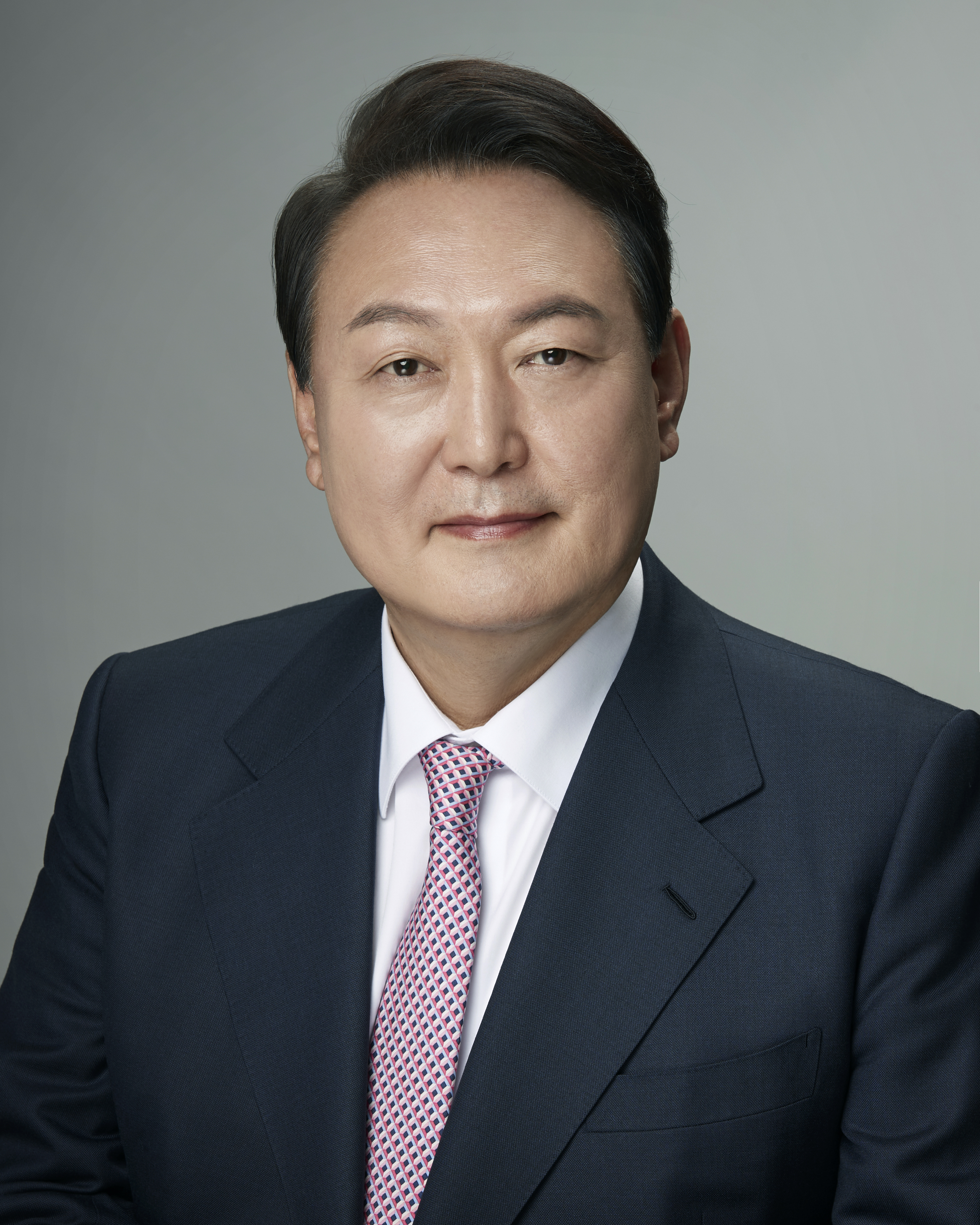
South Korea
Yoon Suk Yeol, President

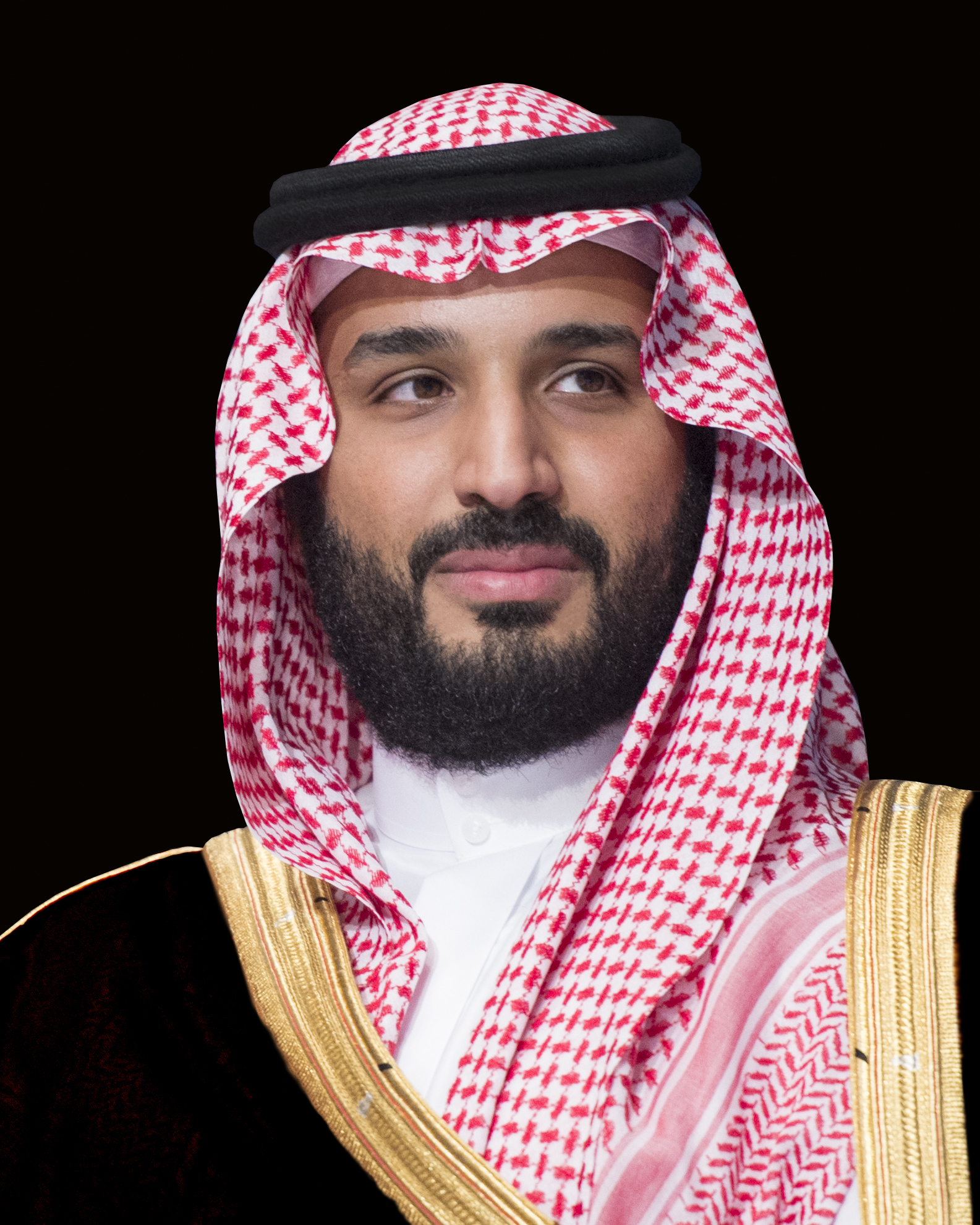
Saudi Arabia
Mohammed bin Salman, Crown Prince and Prime Minister

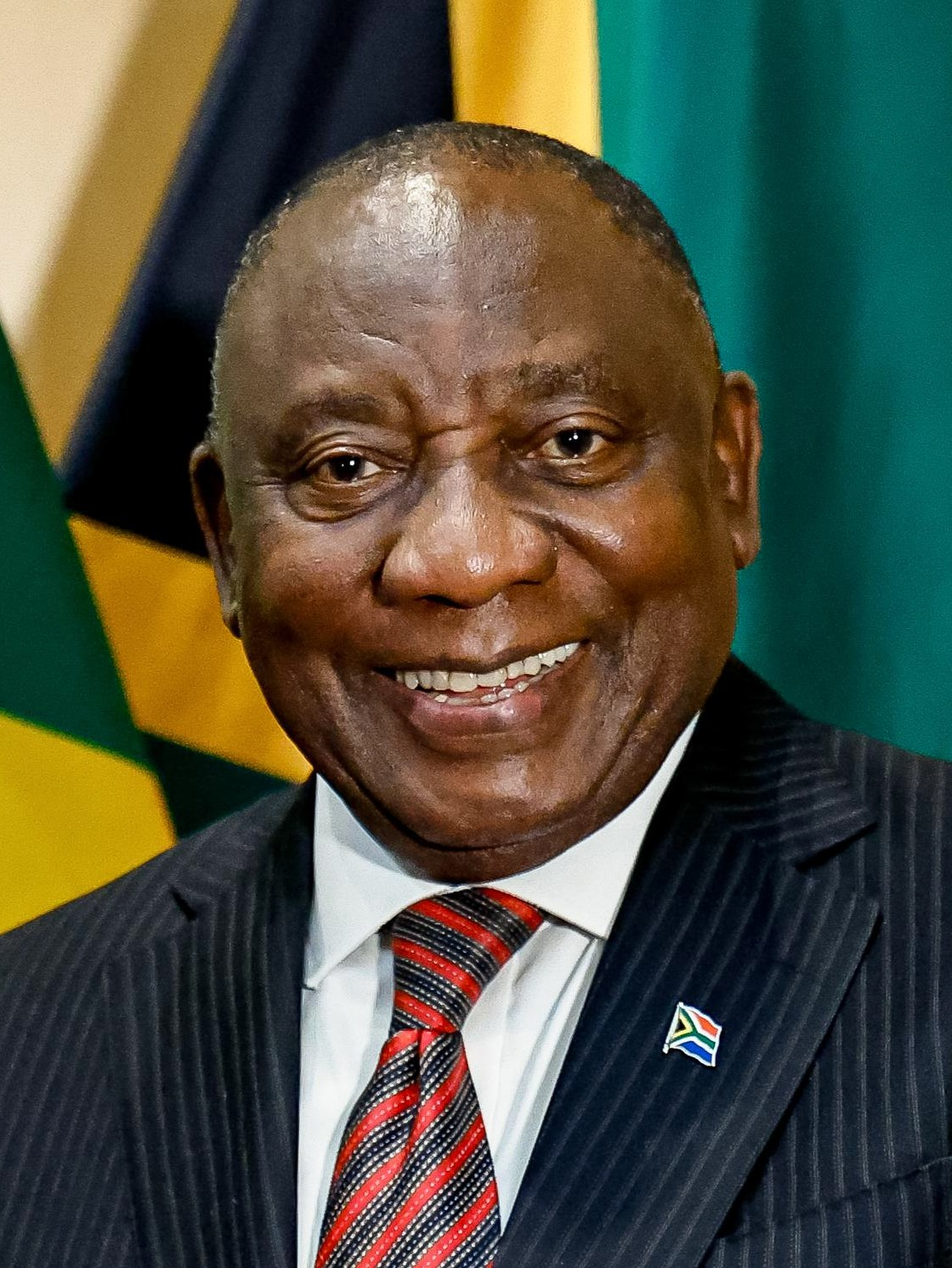
South Africa
Cyril Ramaphosa, President

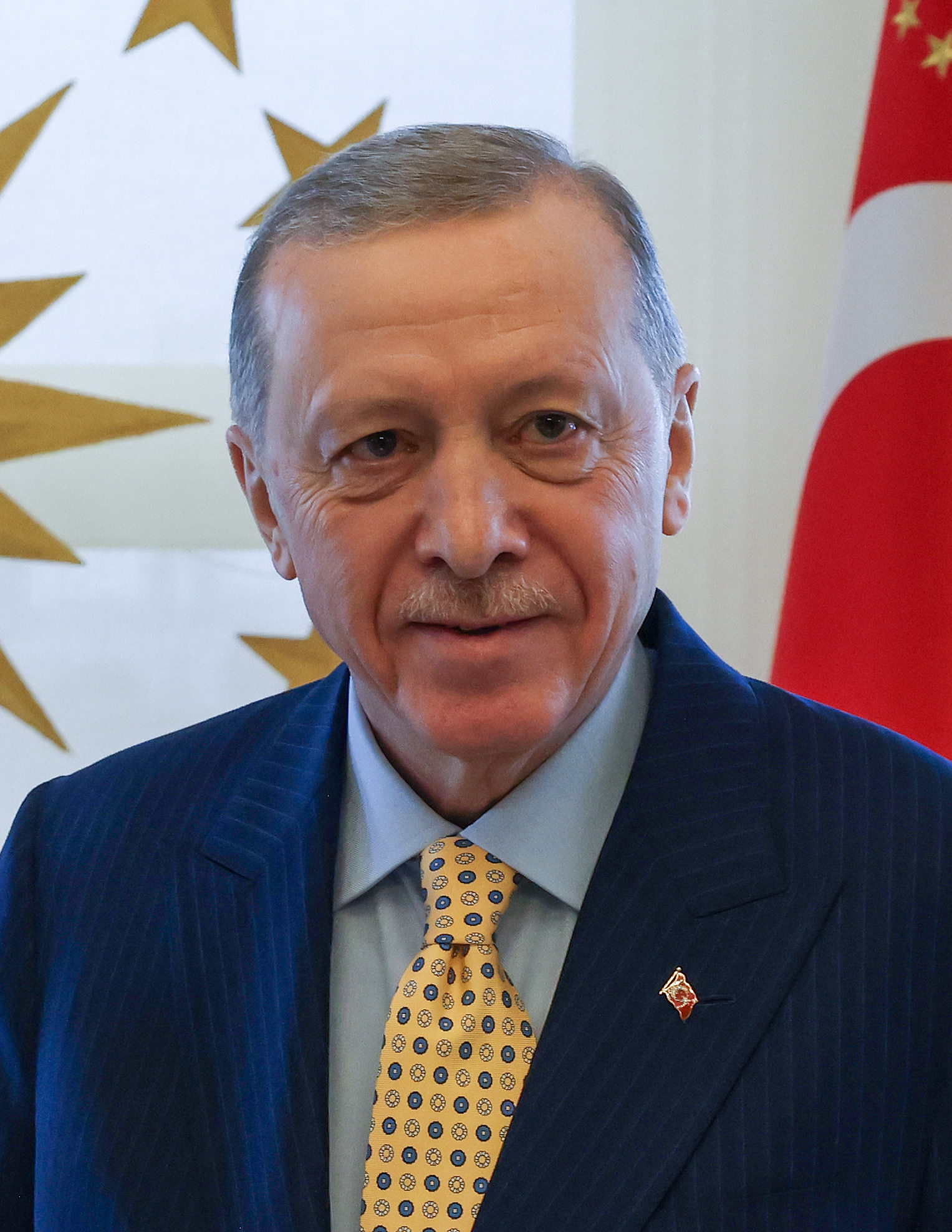
Turkey
Recep Tayyip Erdoğan, President

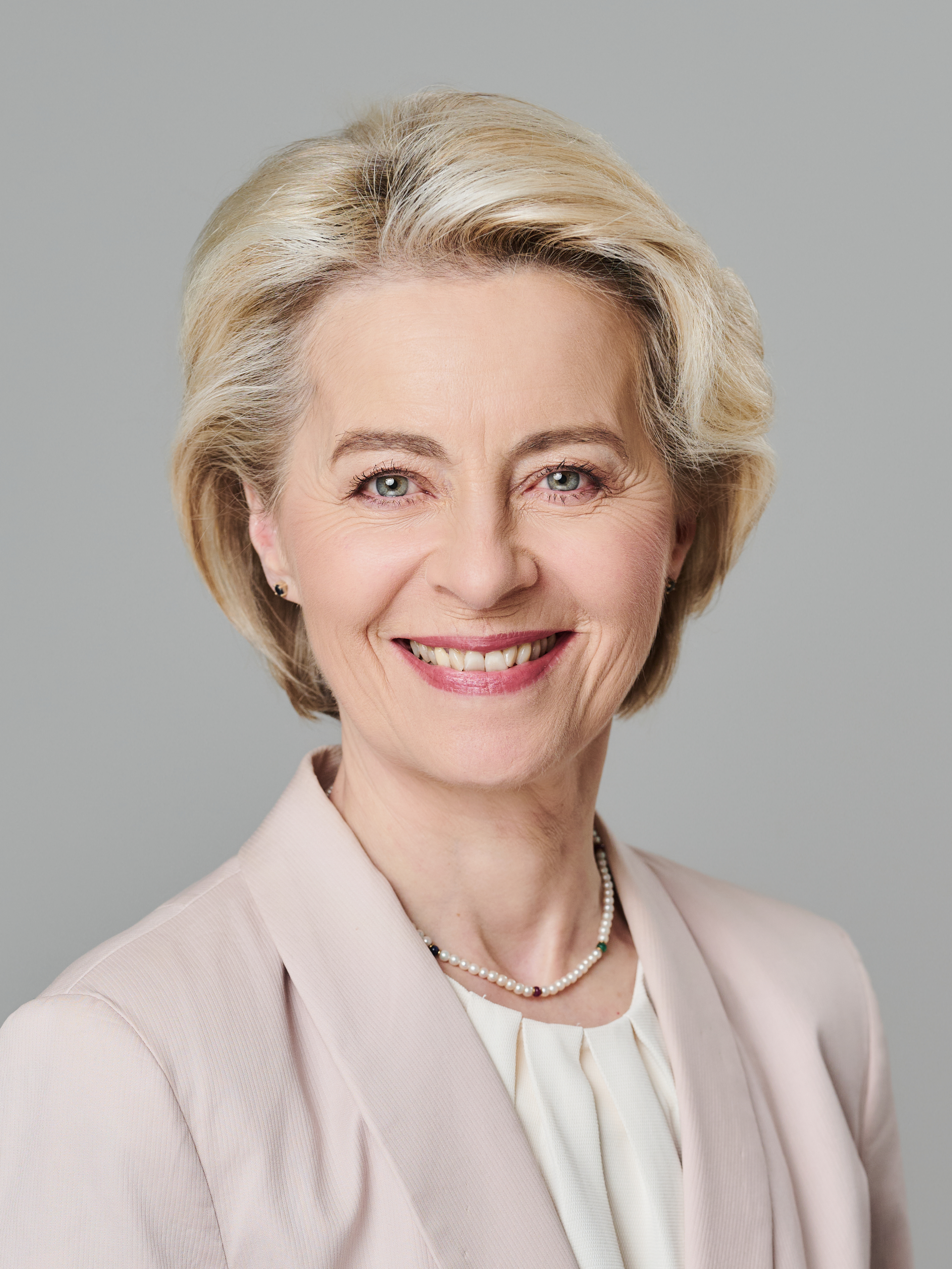
European Union
Ursula von der Leyen, President of the European Commission

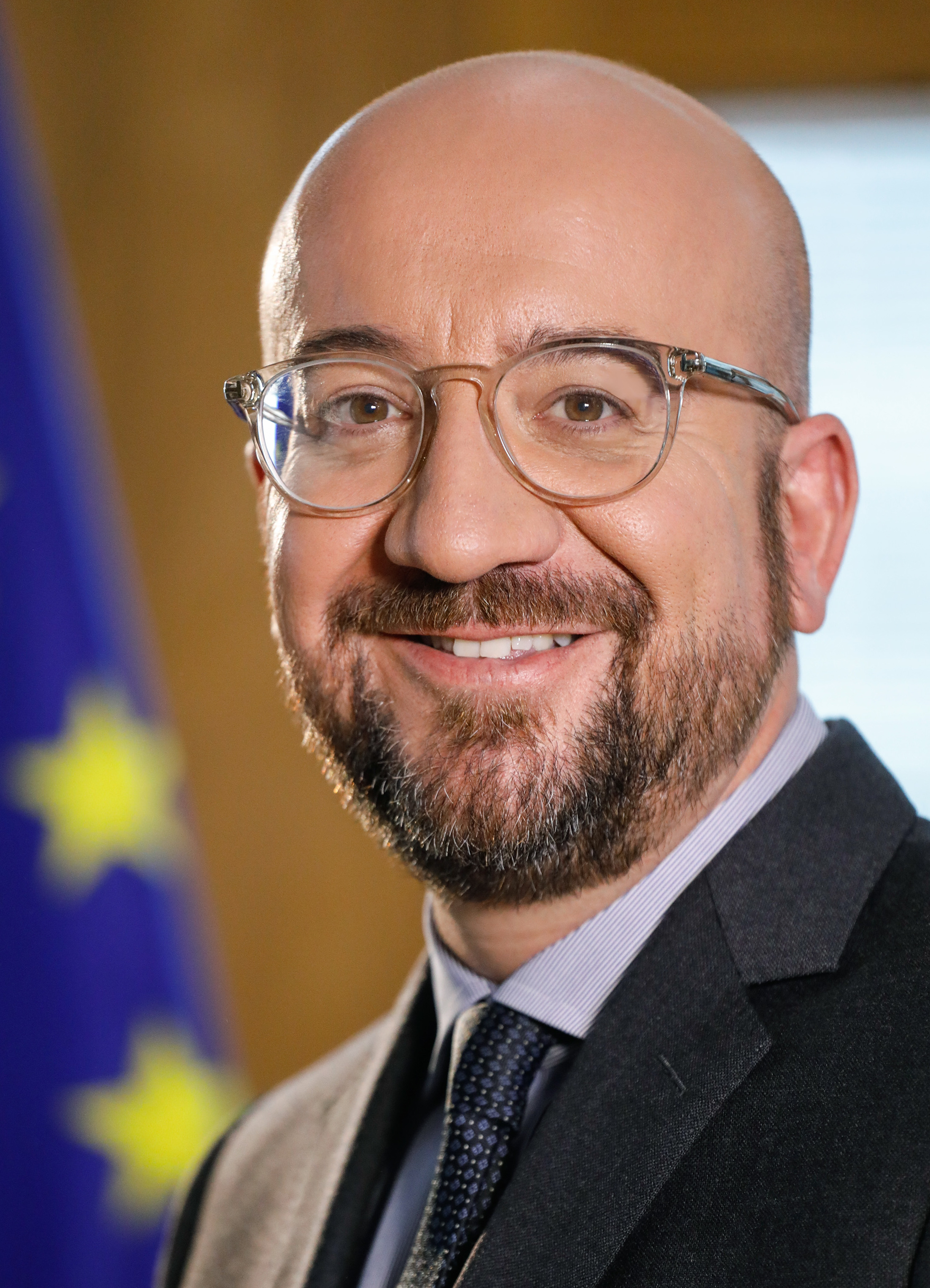
European Union
Charles Michel, President of the European Council

== Invited guests ==
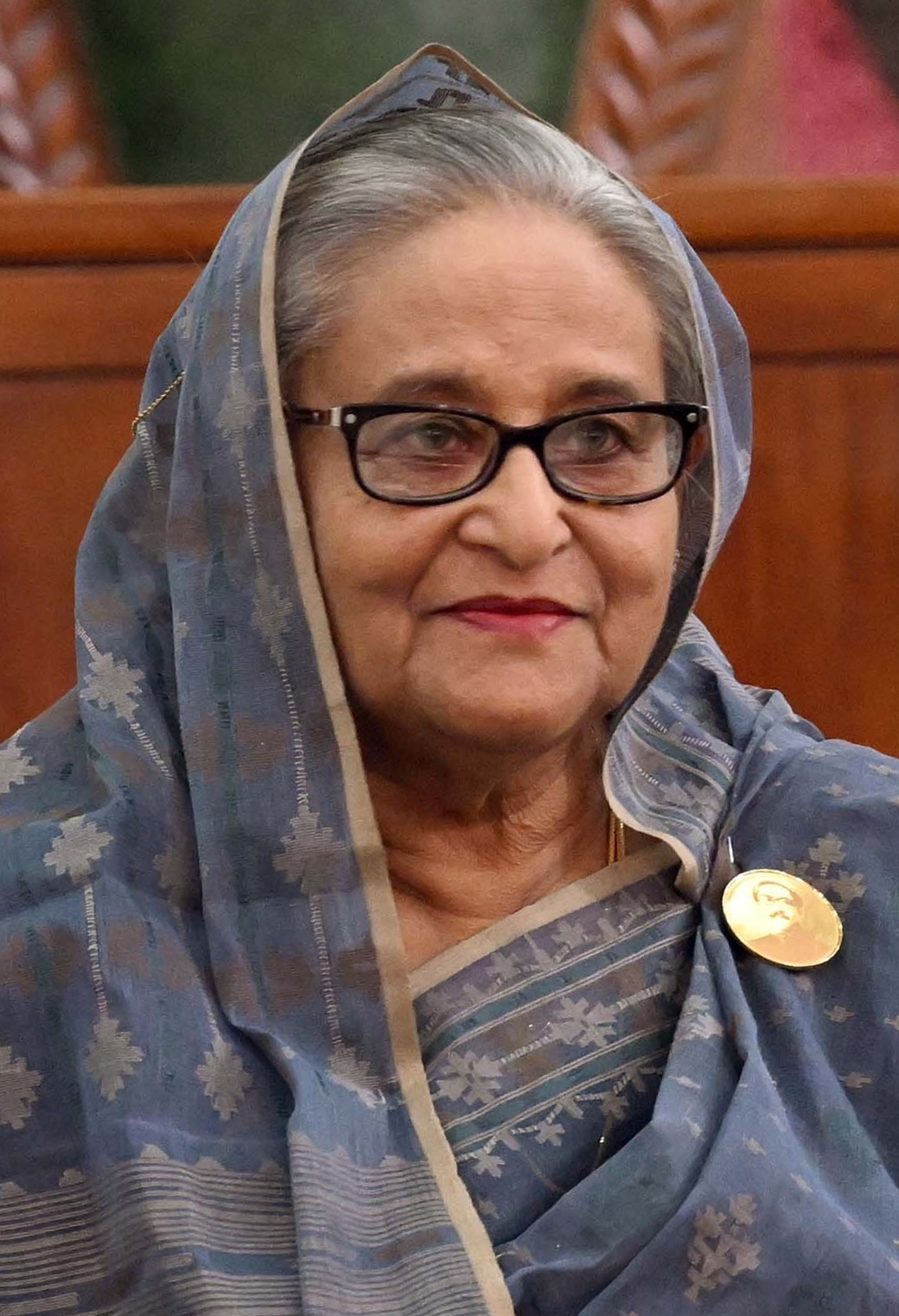
Bangladesh
Sheikh Hasina, Prime Minister

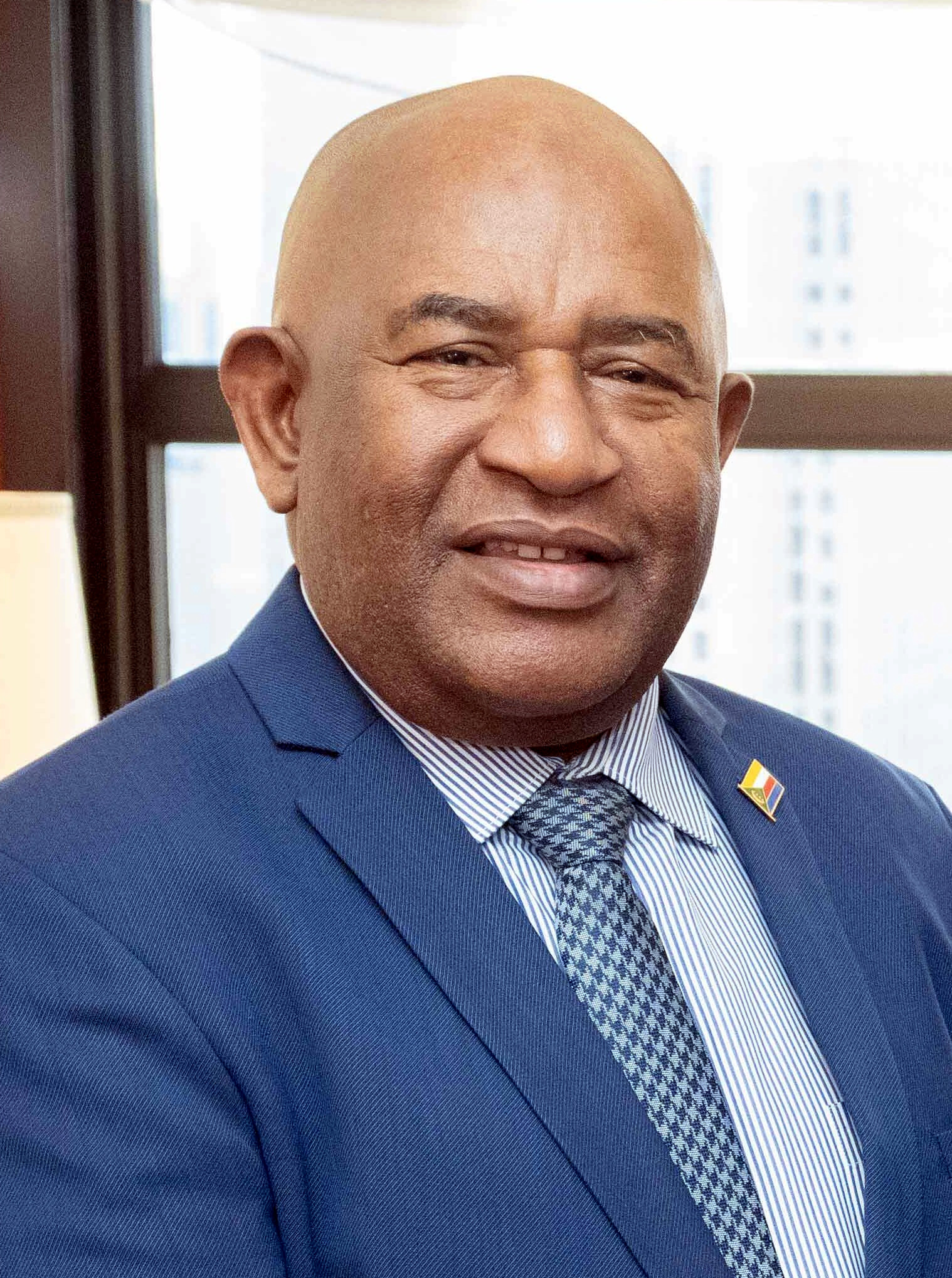
Comoros
Azali Assoumani, President,
2023 Chairperson of the African Union

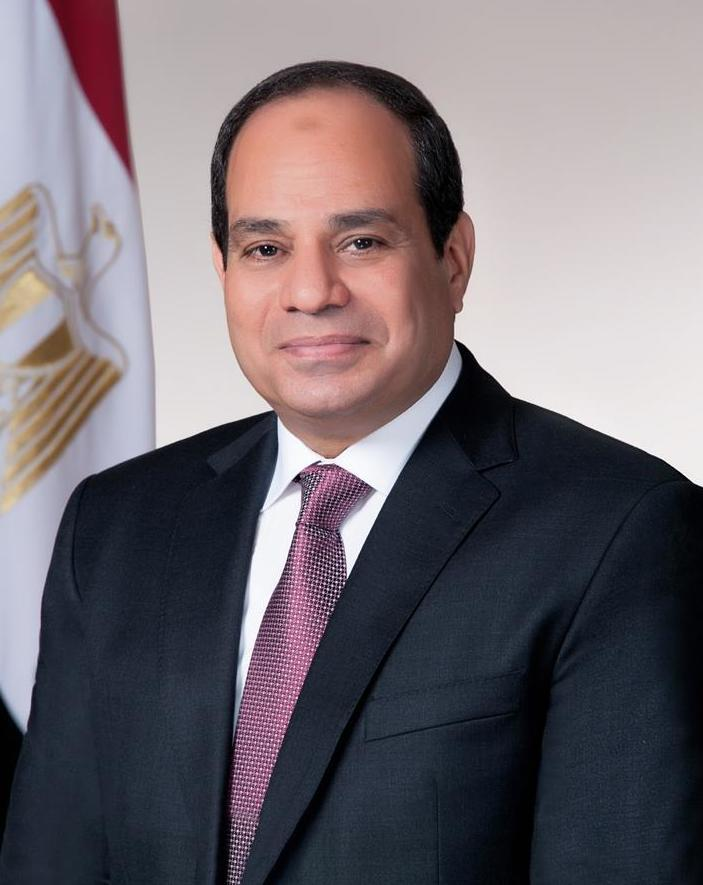
Egypt
Abdel Fattah el-Sisi, President,
2023 Chairperson of NEPAD

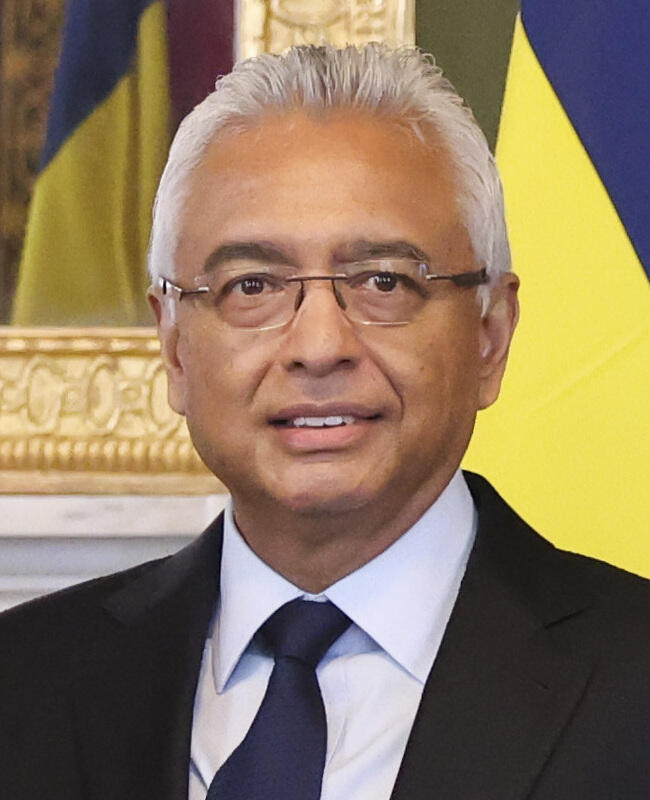
Mauritius
Pravind Jugnauth, Prime Minister

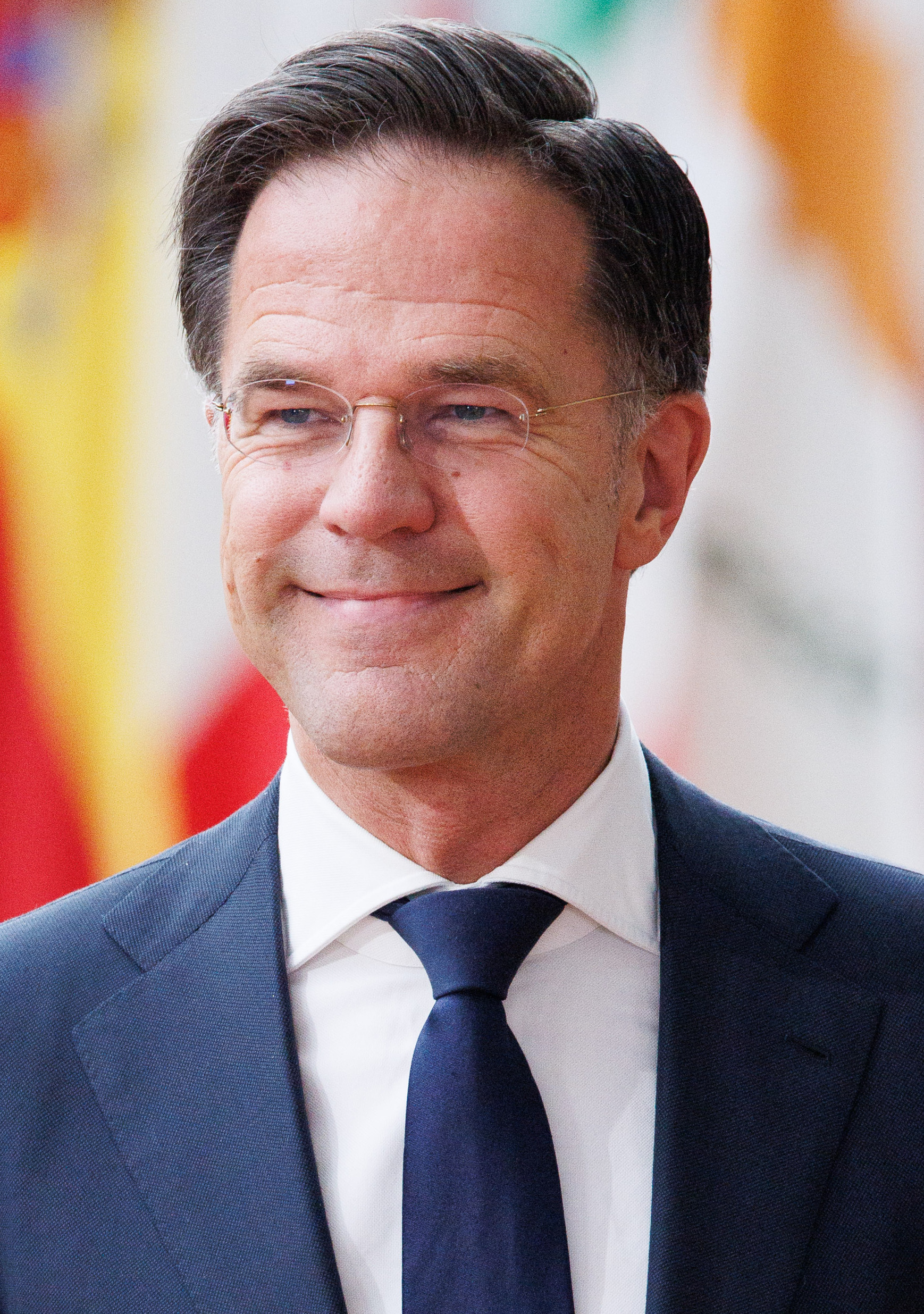
Netherlands
Mark Rutte, Prime Minister

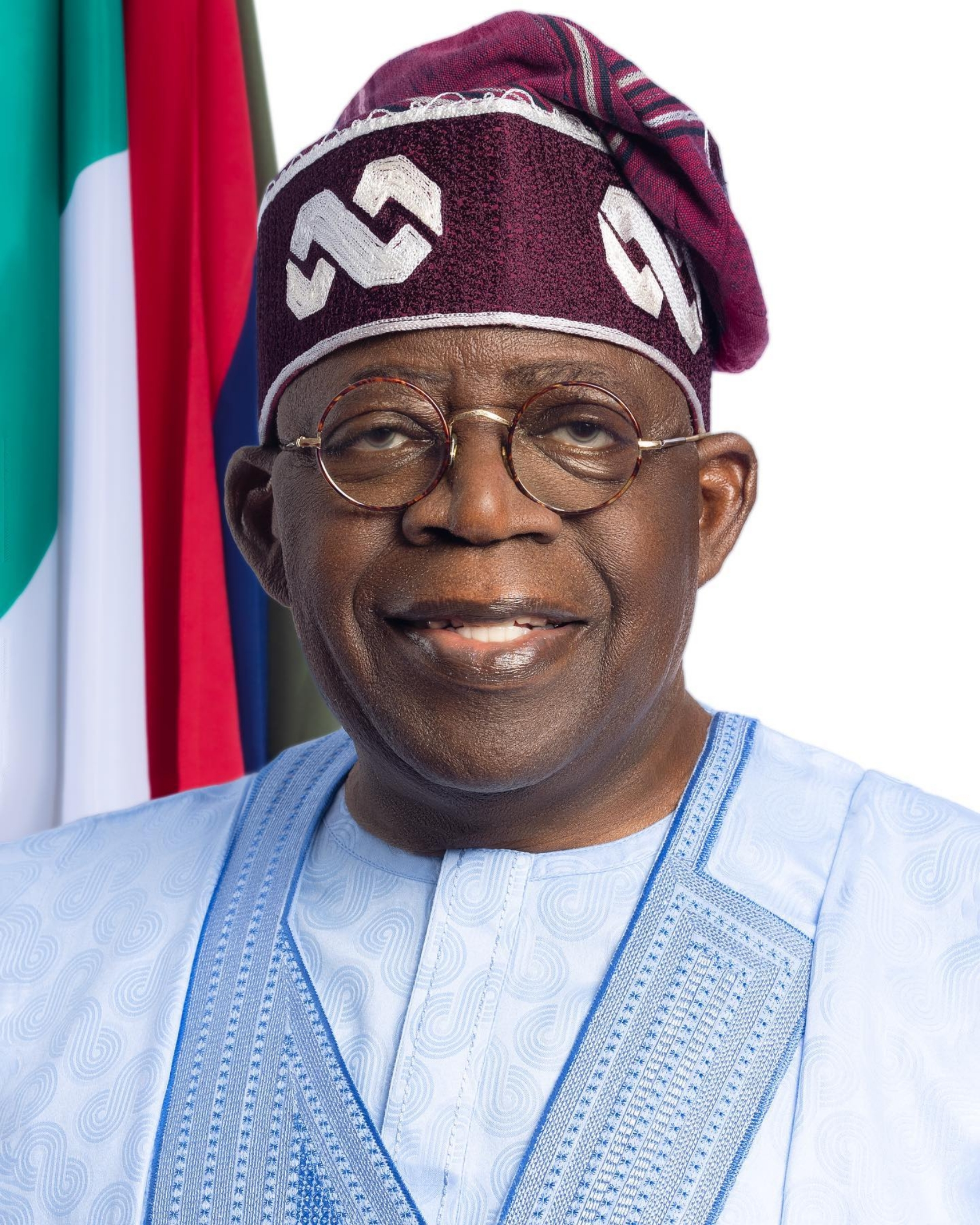
Nigeria
Bola Tinubu, President

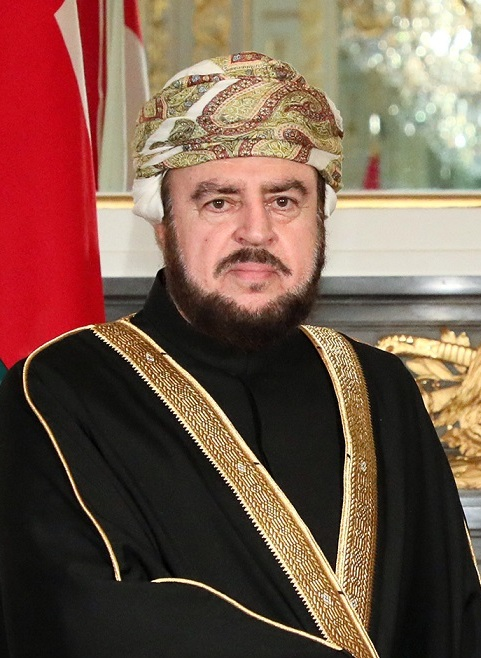
Oman
Asa'ad bin Tariq Al Said, Deputy Prime Minister

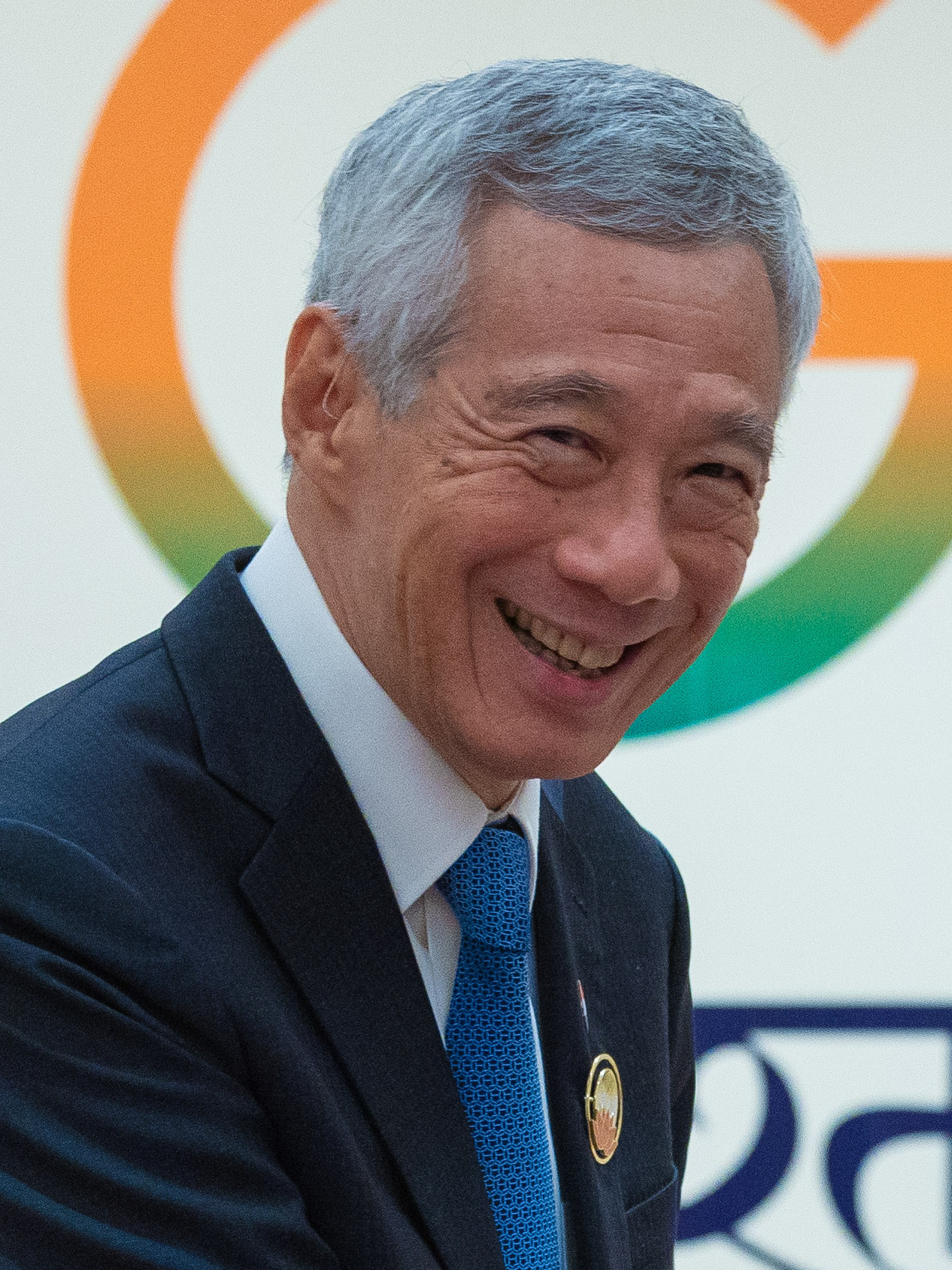
Singapore
Lee Hsien Loong, Prime Minister

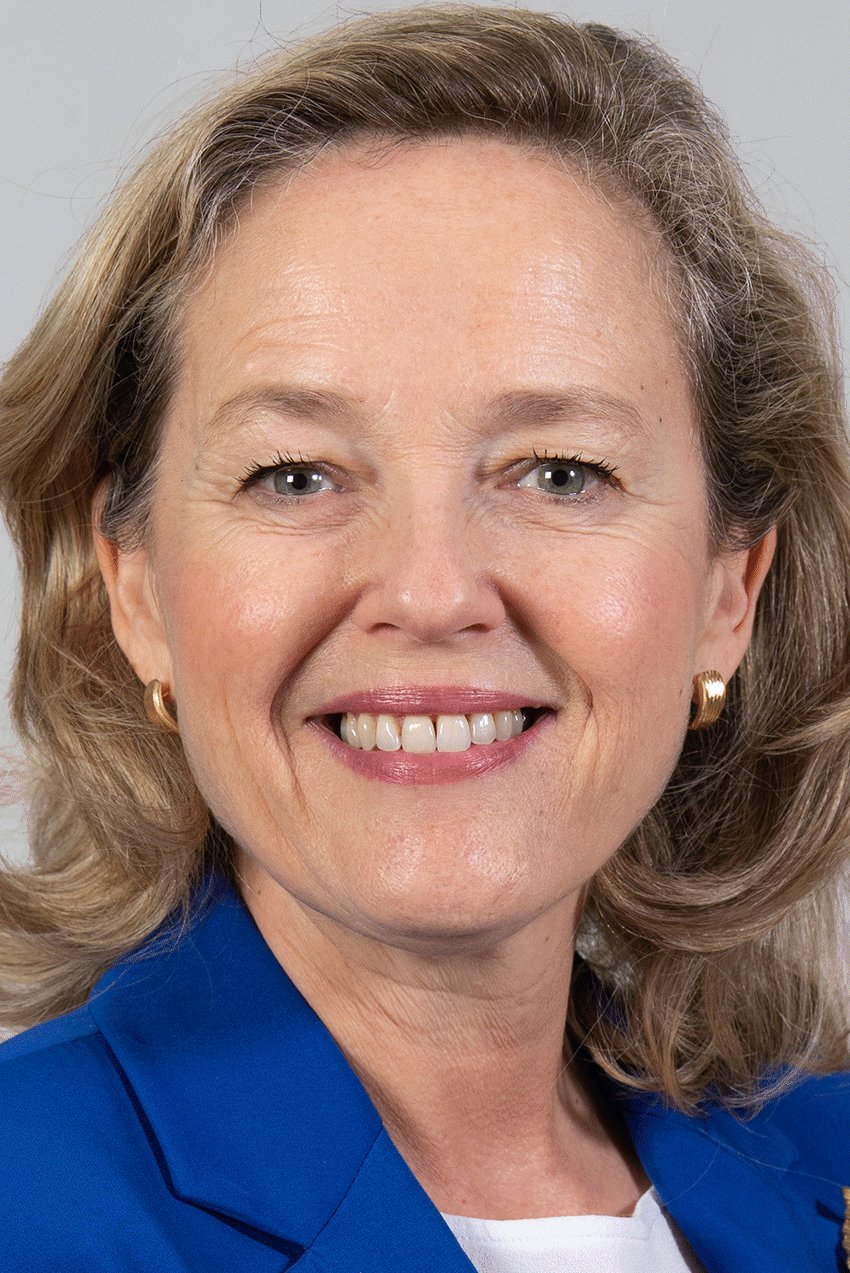
Spain
Nadia Calviño, Deputy Prime Minister,
Permanent guest invitee

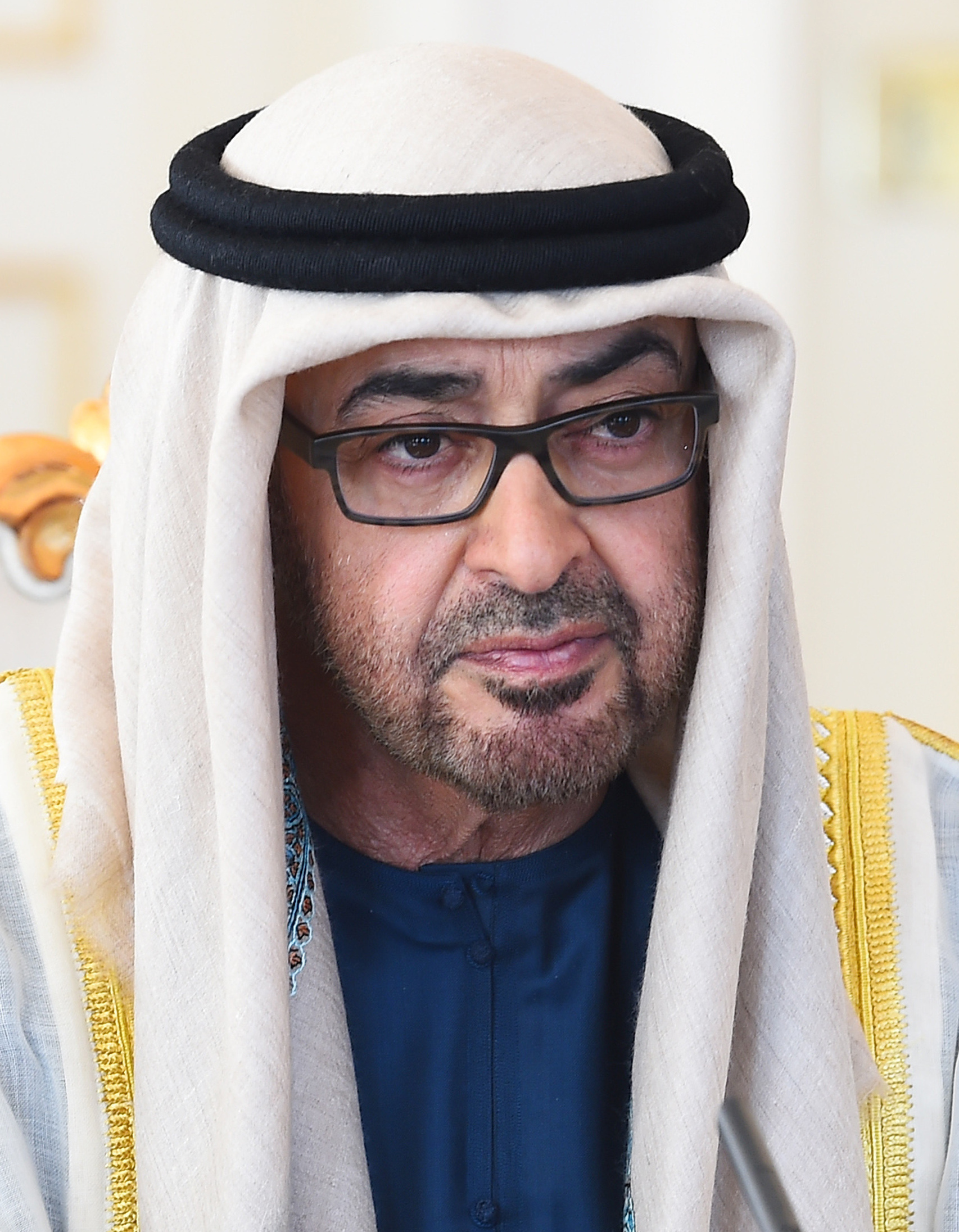
United Arab Emirates
Mohamed bin Zayed Al Nahyan, President

== Participating international organization guests ==
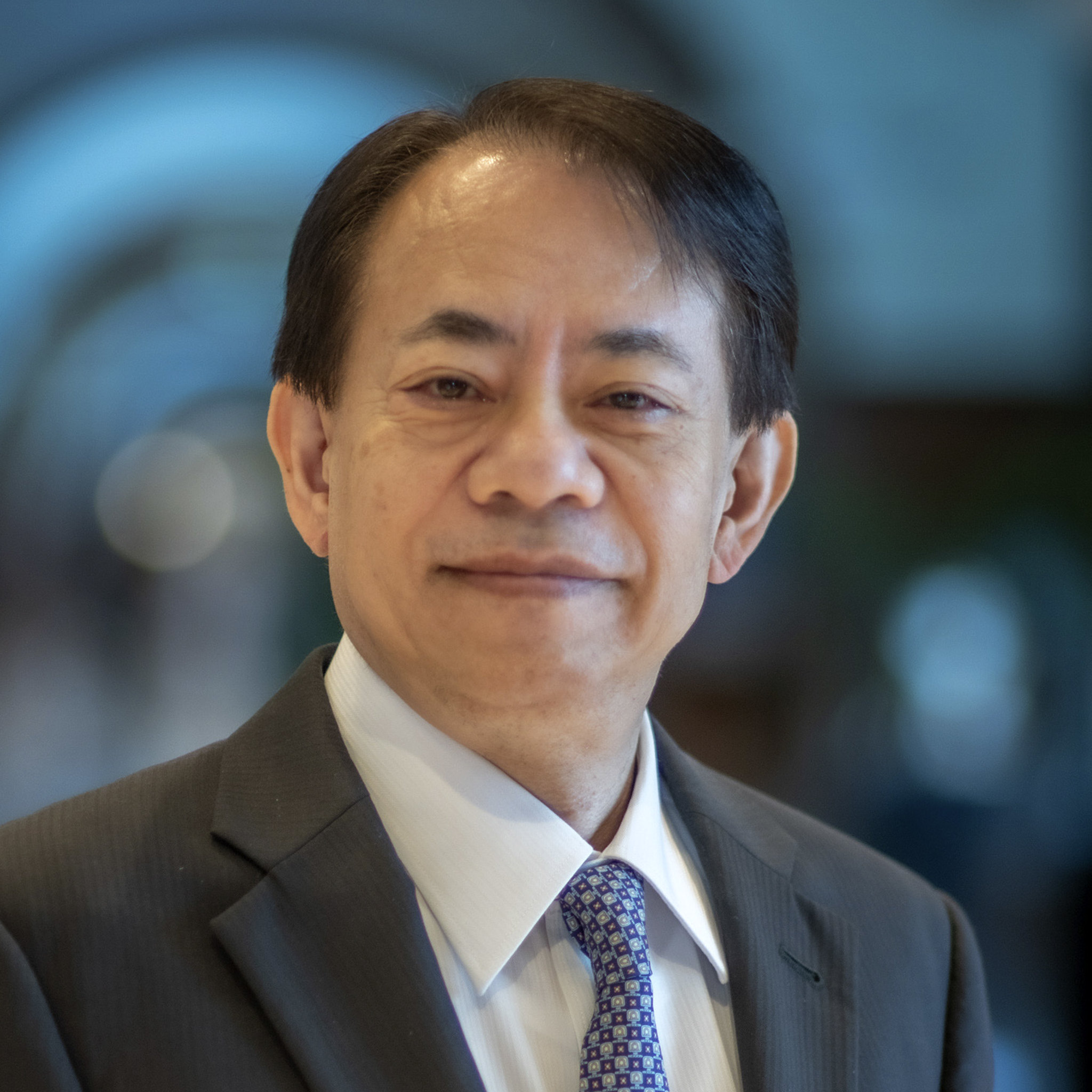
Asian Development Bank
Masatsugu Asakawa, President

Coalition for Disaster Resilient Infrastructure
Amit Prothi, Director General

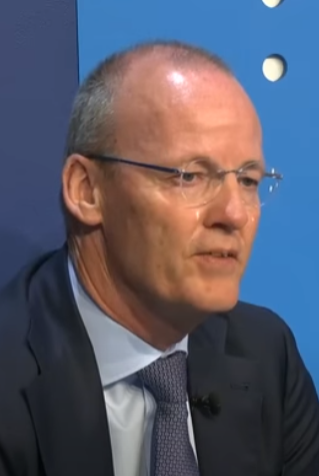
Financial Stability Board
Klaas Knot, Chair

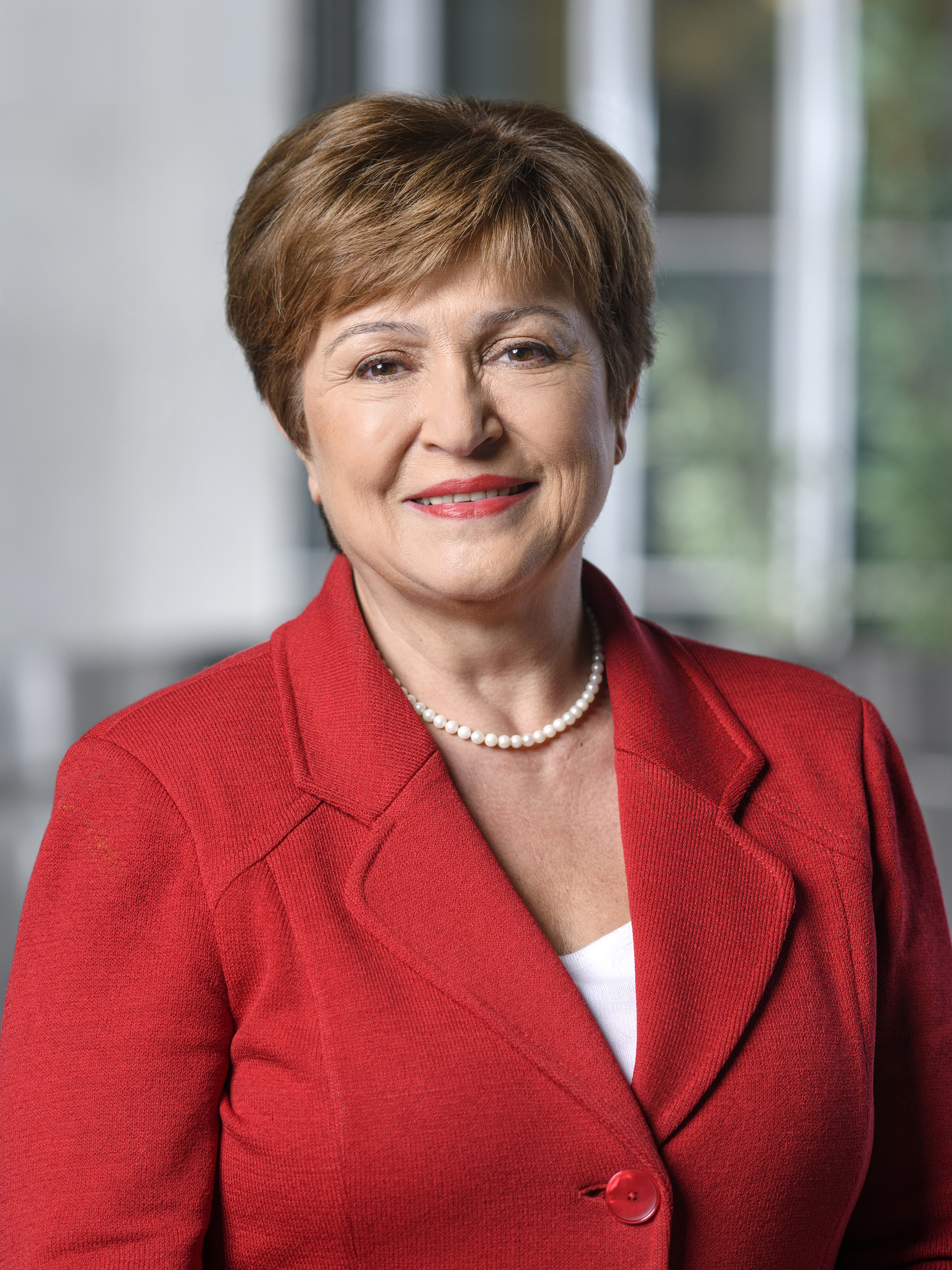
International Monetary Fund
Kristalina Georgieva, Managing Director

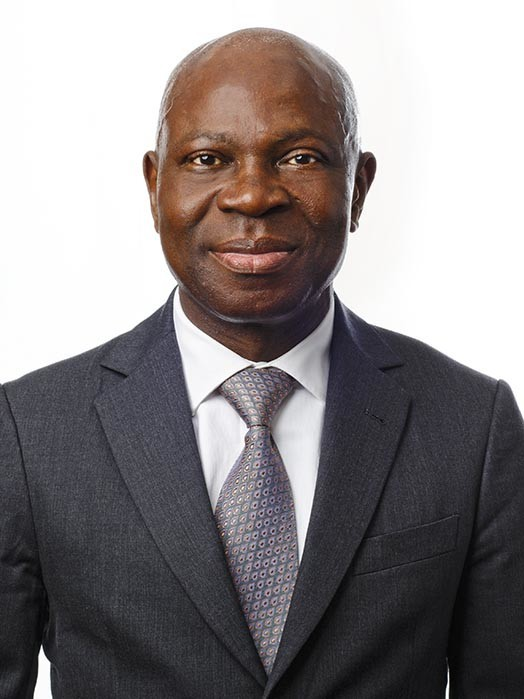
International Labour Organization
Gilbert Houngbo, Director-General

International Solar Alliance
Ajay Mathur, Director-General

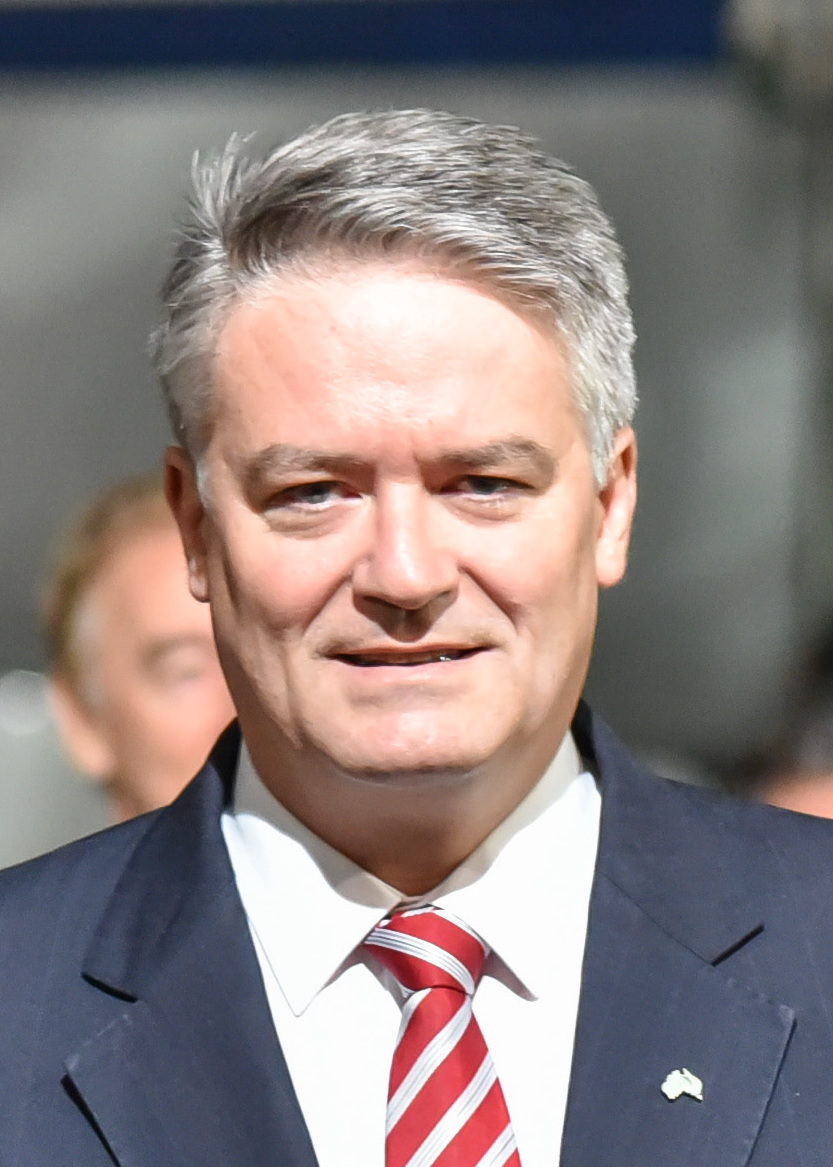
Organisation for Economic Co-operation and Development
Mathias Cormann, Secretary General

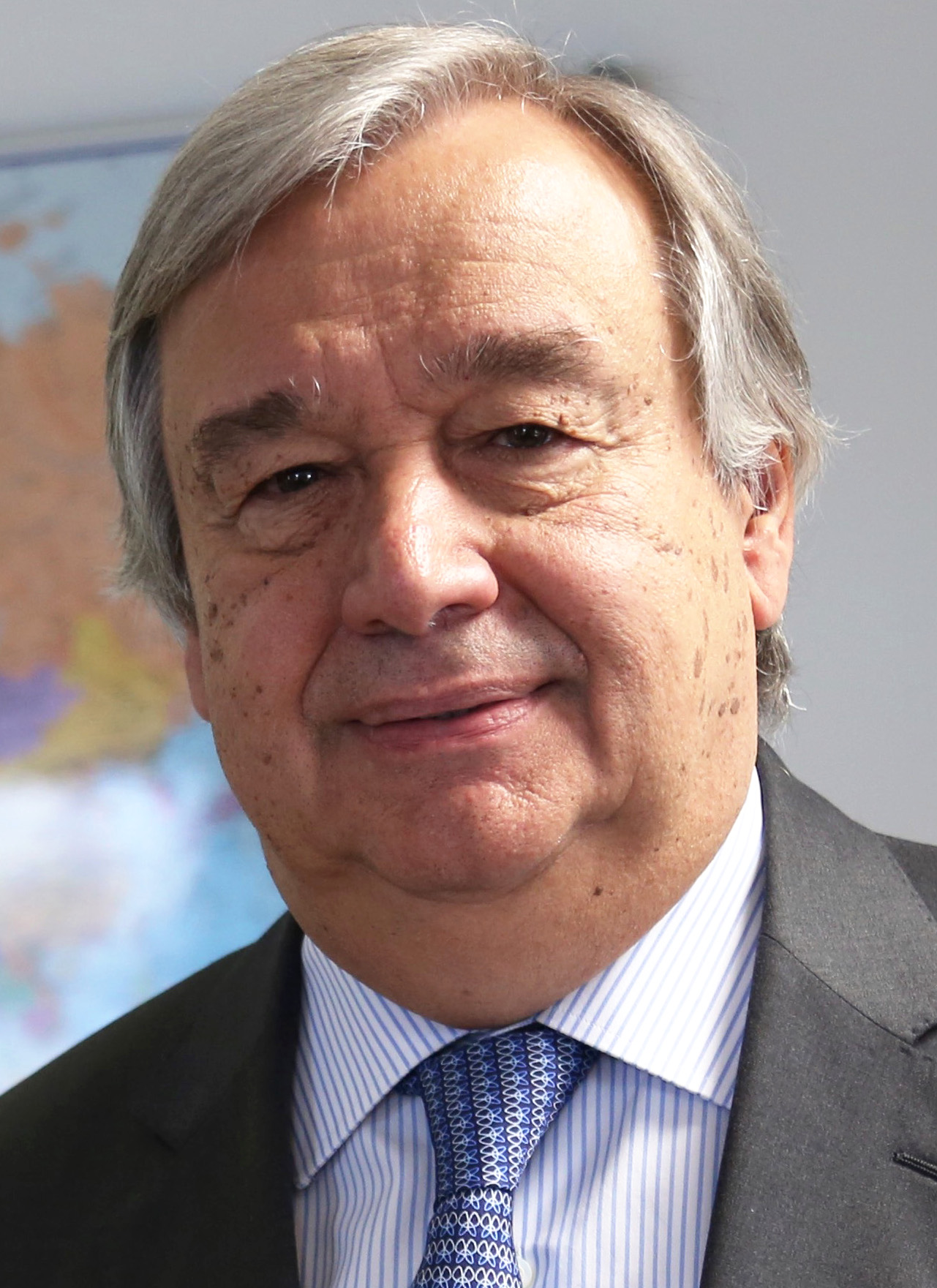
United Nations
António Guterres, Secretary-General

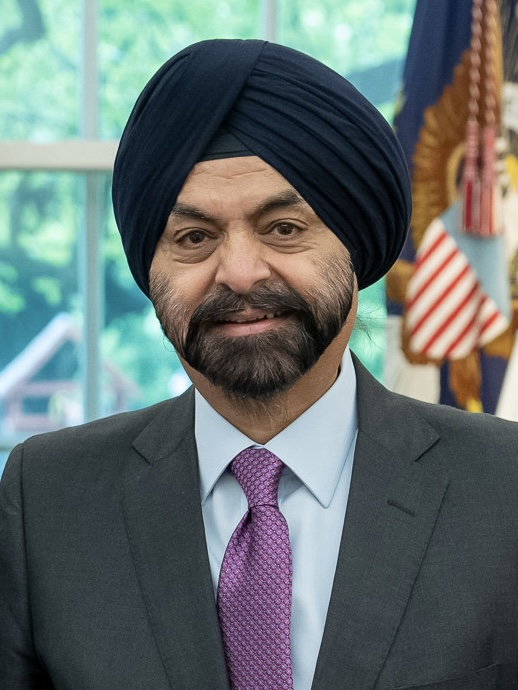
World Bank
Ajay Banga, President

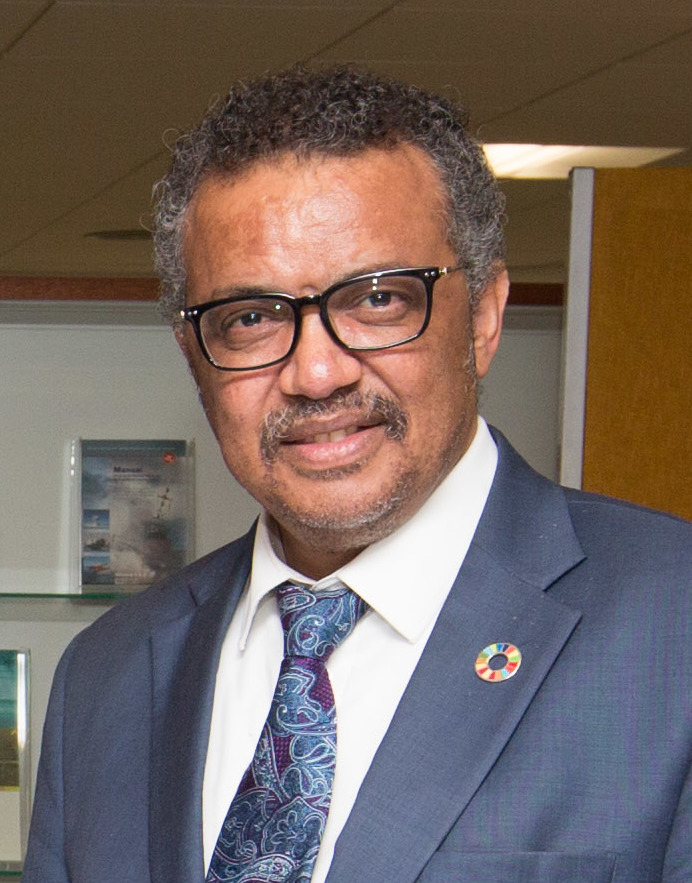
World Health Organization
Tedros Adhanom Ghebreyesus, Director-General

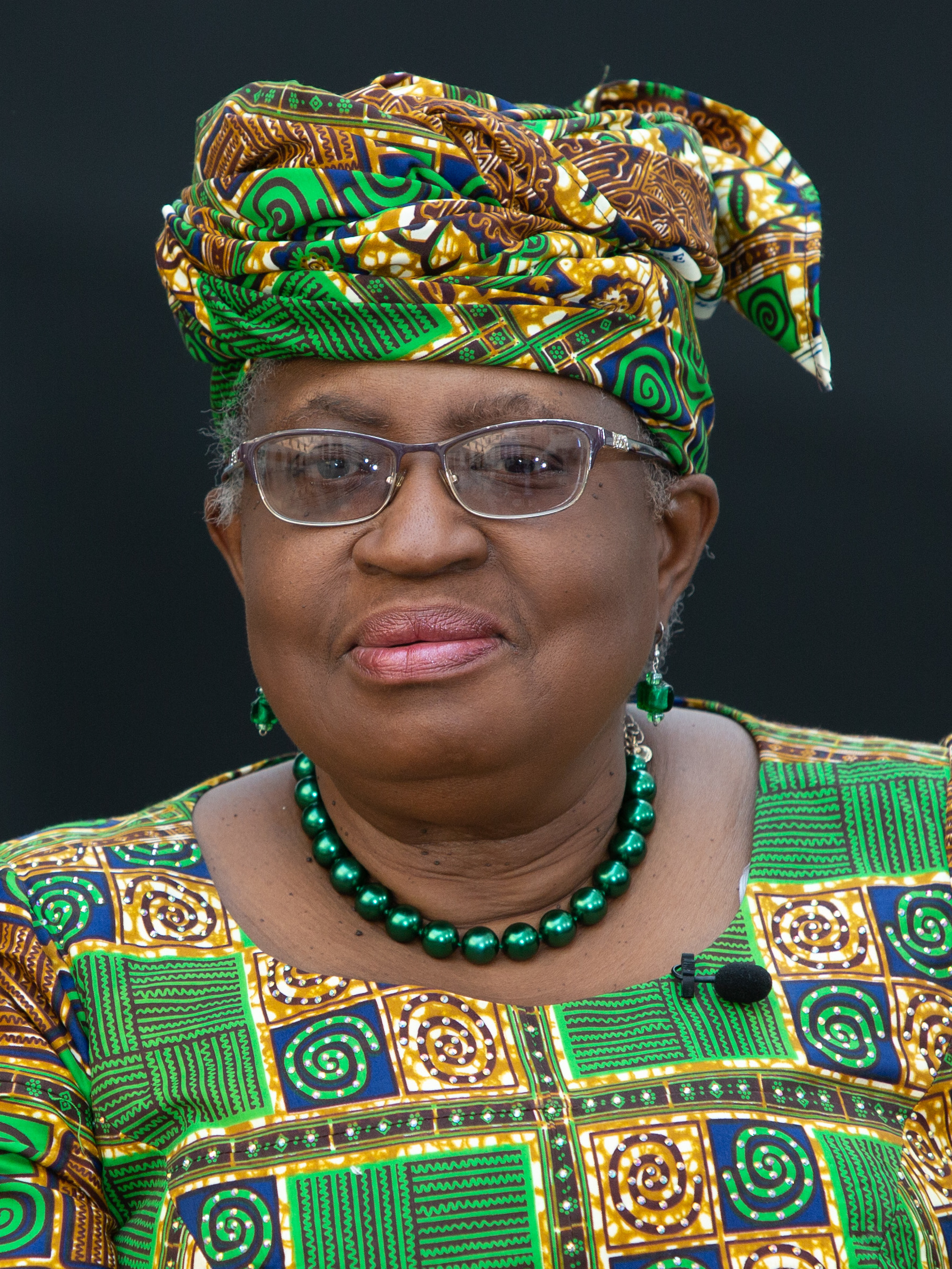
World Trade Organization
Ngozi Okonjo-Iweala, Director-General

== Outcomes ==
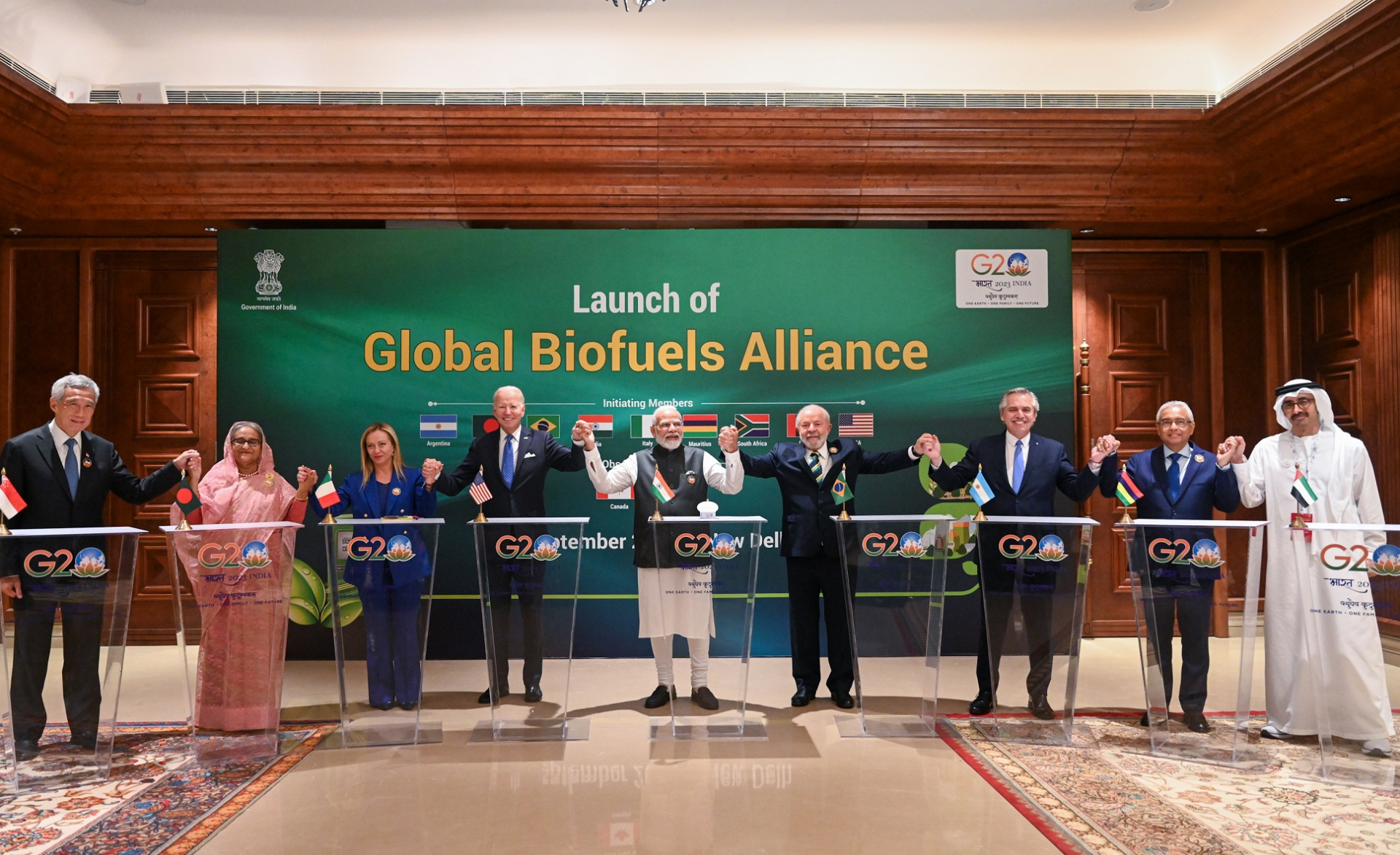
Launch of the Global Biofuels Alliance at G20 New Delhi 2023

- The African Union joined the G20 as a permanent member, the first since the G20's formation in 1999.
- A new organization called the Global Biofuel Alliance (GBA) was launched, to promote the development and adoption of sustainable biofuels, and set relevant standards and certification.
- The New Delhi Leaders Declaration was adopted with consensus.
- A group of countries made a joint agreement to build a rail and shipping corridor linking India with the Middle East and Europe called the India-Middle East-Europe Economic Corridor. The group comprises India, Saudi Arabia, the United Arab Emirates, Jordan, Israel and the European Union.

== See also ==
- 2023 United Nations Climate Change Conference (COP28)
- 49th G7 summit
- African Union
