= Coalition for Disaster Resilient Infrastructure =

International coalition of countries and institutions

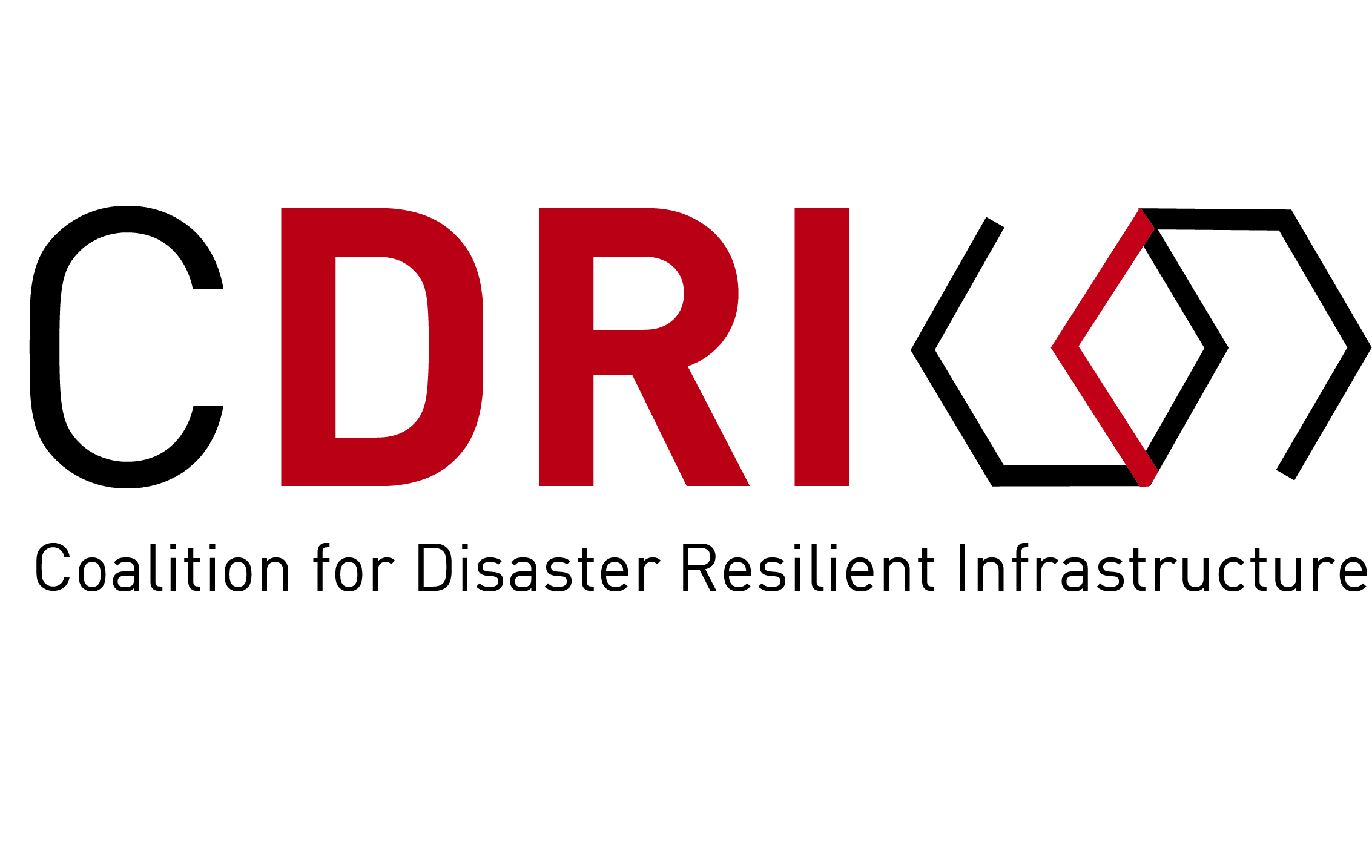
- Abbreviation: CDRI
- Formation: September 23, 2019; 7 years ago
- Founded at: New York, United States
- Purpose: "Promote the resilience of new and existing infrastructure systems to climate and disaster risks, thereby ensuring sustainable development."
- Headquarters: New Delhi, India
- Members: More than 50 Member Countries; More than 10 Member Organizations
- Website: cdri.world

The Coalition for Disaster Resilient Infrastructure (CDRI) is an international coalition of countries, United Nations (UN) agencies, multilateral development banks, the private sector, and academic institutions, that aims to promote disaster-resilient infrastructure. Its objective is to promote research and knowledge sharing in the fields of infrastructure risk management, standards, financing, and recovery mechanisms. It was launched by the Indian Prime Minister Narendra Modi at the 2019 UN Climate Action Summit in September 2019.

CDRI's initial focus is on developing disaster-resilience in ecological, social, and economic infrastructure. It aims to achieve substantial changes in Member Countries' policy frameworks and future infrastructure investments, along with a major reduction in the economic losses suffered due to disasters.

As of 2026, CDRI has more than 60 Members.

== History ==
CDRI was first proposed by Indian Prime Minister Narendra Modi during the 2016 Asian Ministerial Conference on Disaster Risk Reduction held at Vigyan Bhavan, New Delhi. Prime Minister Modi's "experience in dealing with the aftermath of the 2001 Gujarat earthquake" as the State's Chief Minister led him to the idea. CDRI was later conceptualised at the first and second editions of the International Workshop on Disaster Resilient Infrastructure (IWDRI) in 2018–19, which were organized by the National Disaster Management Authority (NDMA) of India, in partnership with the UN Office for Disaster Risk Reduction (UNDRR), the UN Development Programme, the World Bank Group, and the Global Commission on Adaptation.

France, Germany, Italy, the United States and Canada became the Members of CDRI in 2020.

== Cabinet approval ==
Prime Minister Modi approved the proposal for CDRI on 13 August 2019, after which it was approved by the Union Cabinet on 28 August 2019. The Government of India also pledged financial support of ₹480 crore (equivalent to ₹651 crore or US$68 million in 2026) towards the CDRI corpus. It also specified that the financial resources required for research purposes will be met through the existing budget of Ministry of AYUSH's National Medicinal Plants Board. The NDMA Headquarters at Safdarjung Enclave, New Delhi was decided as the site for the interim secretariat of the CDRI. NDMA was also given the task of preparing CDRI's memorandum and by-laws. Design competitions for the CDRI logo and tagline were also organized on the MyGov.in portal with cash prizes of ₹1 lakh (equivalent to ₹1.4 lakh or US$1,400 in 2026) and ₹50,000 (equivalent to ₹68,000 or US$700 in 2026) respectively.

== Members ==
As of September 2026, CDRI consists of more than 51 Member Countries and more than 10 Member Organizations. The CDRI Secretariat is keen to expand its membership to 75 countries and 25 organizations by 2026, with a focus on Southeast Asia, Africa and Small Island Developing States (SIDS).

Member Countries:

- Afghanistan
- Antigua and Barbuda
- Argentina
- Australia
- Bangladesh
- Bhutan
- Brazil
- Canada
- Chad
- Chile
- Colombia
- Cuba
- Dominican Republic
- Ecuador
- Fiji
- France
- Germany
- Ghana
- Grenada
- Guatemala
- Guinea
- Guyana
- Haiti
- Honduras
- India
- Italy
- Jamaica
- Japan
- Kenya
- Madagascar
- Maldives
- Mauritania
- Mauritius
- Mongolia
- Namibia
- Nauru
- Nepal
- Netherlands
- New Zealand
- Peru
- Philippines
- Samoa
- South Sudan
- Sri Lanka
- Tajikistan
- Tonga
- Trinidad and Tobago
- Turkey
- United Kingdom
- United States
- Vietnam

Member Organizations:

- African Union
- ARISE - Private Sector Alliance for Disaster Resilient Societies
- Asian Development Bank
- Caribbean Disaster Emergency Management Agency (CDEMA)
- ECOWAS (Economic Community of West African States)
- European Investment Bank
- European Union
- United Nations Development Programme
- United Nations Office for Disaster Risk Reduction
- World Bank Group

== Launch ==
Modi officially launched the CDRI at the 2019 UN Climate Action Summit in New York, United States on 23 September 2019. He termed it as a "practical approach and roadmap" towards climate change mitigation, adding that "an ounce of practice is worth more than a ton of preaching." Twelve countries participated in the launch event alongside India: namely Australia, Bhutan, Fiji, Indonesia, Italy, Japan, Maldives, Mexico, Mongolia, Rwanda, Sri Lanka and the United Kingdom. The World Bank and the Green Climate Fund also supported the launch.

Whenever there is a cataclysmic climate event, infrastructure gets undermined and overwhelmed very quickly, and it becomes very difficult for developing countries or countries that do not have the economic wherewithal to address these.

— Syed Akbaruddin, Permanent Representative of India to the UN

Syed Akbaruddin, India's Permanent Representative to the UN, said that India wants to leverage its ability to convene geographically and economically diverse nations to "work across the board and to bring to the table a group of countries who are ready to address issues of infrastructure." The Special Representative of the Secretary-General for Disaster Risk Reduction, Mami Mizutori, termed CDRI as a "transformative initiative", adding that disaster-resilient infrastructure is "critical" to reduce economic losses significantly. She also mentioned that such recurring losses weaken poverty eradication and sustainable development efforts.

The Indian Government and the UNDRR co-hosted an event called "Resilient Infrastructure: Key to the Success of the 2030 Agenda for Sustainable Development", where the Indian Minister of Environment, Forest and Climate Change, Prakash Javadekar, said that the CDRI is an "initiative that brings together developed and the developing countries, small island states, landlocked countries, countries with advanced infrastructure systems, and countries with large infrastructure deficits."

== Diplomatic significance ==
The CDRI is the second major coalition launched by India outside of the UN, the first being the International Solar Alliance. Both of them are seen as India's attempts to obtain a global leadership role in climate change matters, and were termed as part of India's stronger branding by India's Minister of External Affairs, Subrahmanyam Jaishankar, at the fourth Ramnath Goenka Lecture in November 2019. While giving an interview to the India Today, he cited them to prove India's "much greater willingness to engage multiple players" under Modi's leadership.

Sreeram Chaulia, dean of the Jindal School of International Affairs at the O. P. Jindal Global University, said that India and Japan, with their joint experience in disaster management, can use the CDRI to provide a safer alternative to China's Belt and Road Initiative (BRI). However BRI is an infrastructure creation and funding initiative unlike the CDRI, which is an international knowledge platform.

== See also ==
- Sendai Framework for Disaster Risk Reduction
- World Conference on Disaster Risk Reduction
