= Asian Ministerial Conference on Disaster Risk Reduction =

Intergovernmental conference on disaster mitigation

Asian ministerial conference for disaster risk reduction (AMCDRR) is an intergovernmental conference held to discuss disaster mitigation. Its inaugural meeting was held in Beijing, in August 2005, after the adoption of Hyogo Framework for Action (2005–2015). The conference has been held eight times in collaboration with the United Nations Office for Disaster Risk Reduction (UNISDR). The motive of such conference was to mitigate the disaster risks. After the Indian Ocean tsunami came in 2004, India was among the five countries that were very badly impacted and took prime initiative to endorse for creating new laws for disaster risk management.

The other six Asian Ministerial Conference on Disaster Risk Reduction held in past are as follows:

- China in 2005
- India in 2007
- Malaysia in 2008
- Republic of Korea in 2010
- Indonesia in 2012
- Thailand in 2014
- India in 2016
- Mongolia in 2018

== Objectives ==
- Transforming the commitments made in Sendai by the governments into visible action.
- Deciding the direction for implementation and monitoring of the Sendai Framework.

== Agenda ==
A ten point agenda was set.

First, development projects will be built to appropriate standards. The new infrastructure should be planned under standards of disaster safety and technologies of disaster resilient .
Second, insurance coverage to all should be there, whether poor or rich. The Suraksha Bima Yojana acts as a tool to give risk insurance to millions.
Third, to ensure greater involvement and leadership of women in disaster risk management.
Fourth, is to identify Seismic zones based on high and low risk and map the risks globally.
Fifth, to map and exchange expertise, technology and resources in a collaborative way that would go a long way in maximizing the collective impact.
Sixth, to make universities for disaster issues in coastal region and the hill cities.
Seventh to utilize the social media in transforming the disaster response.
Eight, to enhance local capacity based on using the best traditional practices.
Ninth is learning from every disaster. Research should be done and papers should be released so that more preparedness can be kept when same kind of tragedy happens again.
Tenth, bring about greater cooperation among international response to disasters.

== Outcomes ==
Many years of data have proved that tsunamis can badly impact most regions of the world and there is a need of urgent response to mitigate the disaster risks.

The outcomes include the New Delhi Declaration, which endorses the governments to actively participate to preventing and decreasing risks and strengthening resilience among nations of the Asian region with adopted approach of shared responsibility.
