= Urban resilience =

Ability of a city to function after a crisis

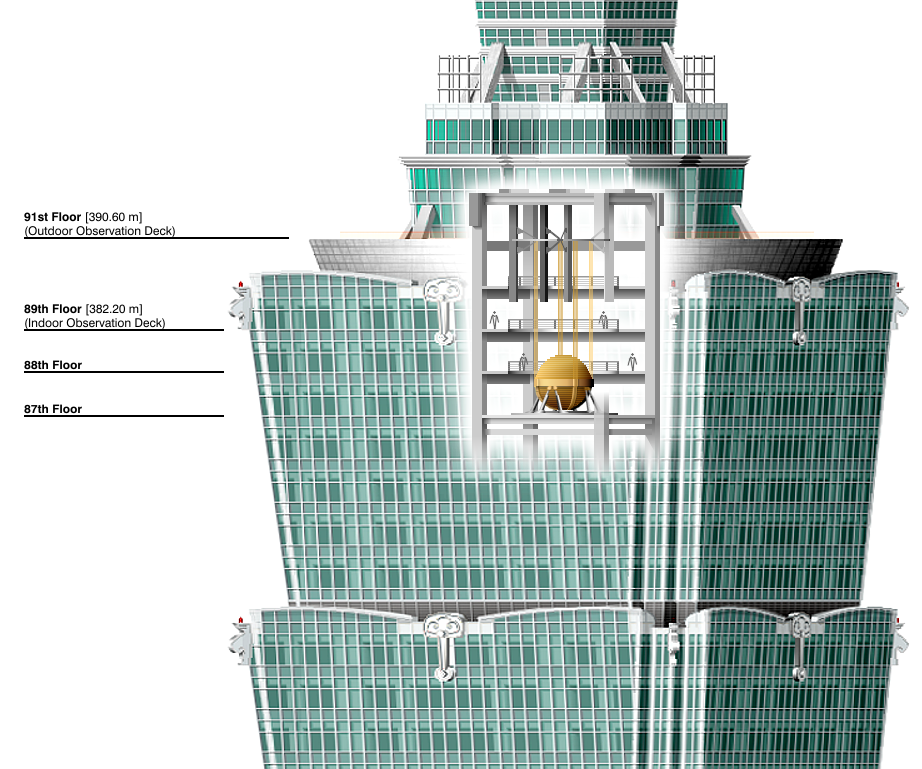
Tuned mass damper in Taipei 101, the world's eleventh tallest skyscraper.

Urban resilience describes the ability of a city or urban community to withstand, recover from or adapt to man-made and natural disasters. This concept includes the resilience of physical infrastructure and social, health, and economic systems.

== History ==
According to urban historian Roger W. Lotchin, World War II had a profound environmental impact on urban areas in the USA. By 1945, Pittsburgh and other cities along the Mississippi River experienced levels of air pollution that are comparable to the Dust Bowl. World War II more directly impacted many cities that were the site of battles and bombings, such as Hiroshima, Chongqing, Stalingrad, and Dresden.

Environmental history first emerged as an academic research topic in the 1970s, initially focusing on rural areas. Pioneers of urban environmental history include: Martin Melosi, Christine Rosen, Joel A. Tarr, Peter Brimblecombe, Bill Luckin, and Christopher Hamlin.

In recent years, the concept of resilience in the urban planning of cities has become a point of consideration. Social scientists have taken increased interest in ecological resilience as the links between social-ecological systems are being examined. Urban policy groups around the globe are putting forward proposals to enhance the urban resilience of cities. The definition of urban resilience is no longer limited to solely the speed at which an urban system recovers after a shock.

== Academic research focus ==
Academic discussion of urban resilience has historically focused primarily on three threats: climate change, natural disasters, and terrorism. Accordingly, resilience strategies were often studied in the context of counter-terrorism, other disasters (earthquakes, wildfires, tsunamis, coastal flooding, solar flares, etc.), and infrastructure adoption of sustainable energy. Recent scholarship has begun to explore resilience at the national scale, and what enables states or peoples to continue as sovereign entities over the long term.

More recently, there has been increased attention on the evolution of urban resilience and the capability of urban systems to adapt to changing conditions. This branch of resilience theory builds on the notion of cities as highly complex adaptive systems. As a result, academic discussions of urban planning include plans informed by network science, involving less interference in the functioning of cities. Network science provides a way of linking city size to the forms of networks that most likely allow cities to function. These perspectives can provide further insights into the potential effectiveness of various urban policies. This requires a better understanding of the types of practices and tools that contribute to building urban resilience. Genealogical approaches explore the evolution of these practices over time, including the values and power relations underpinning them.

== Investment decisions ==
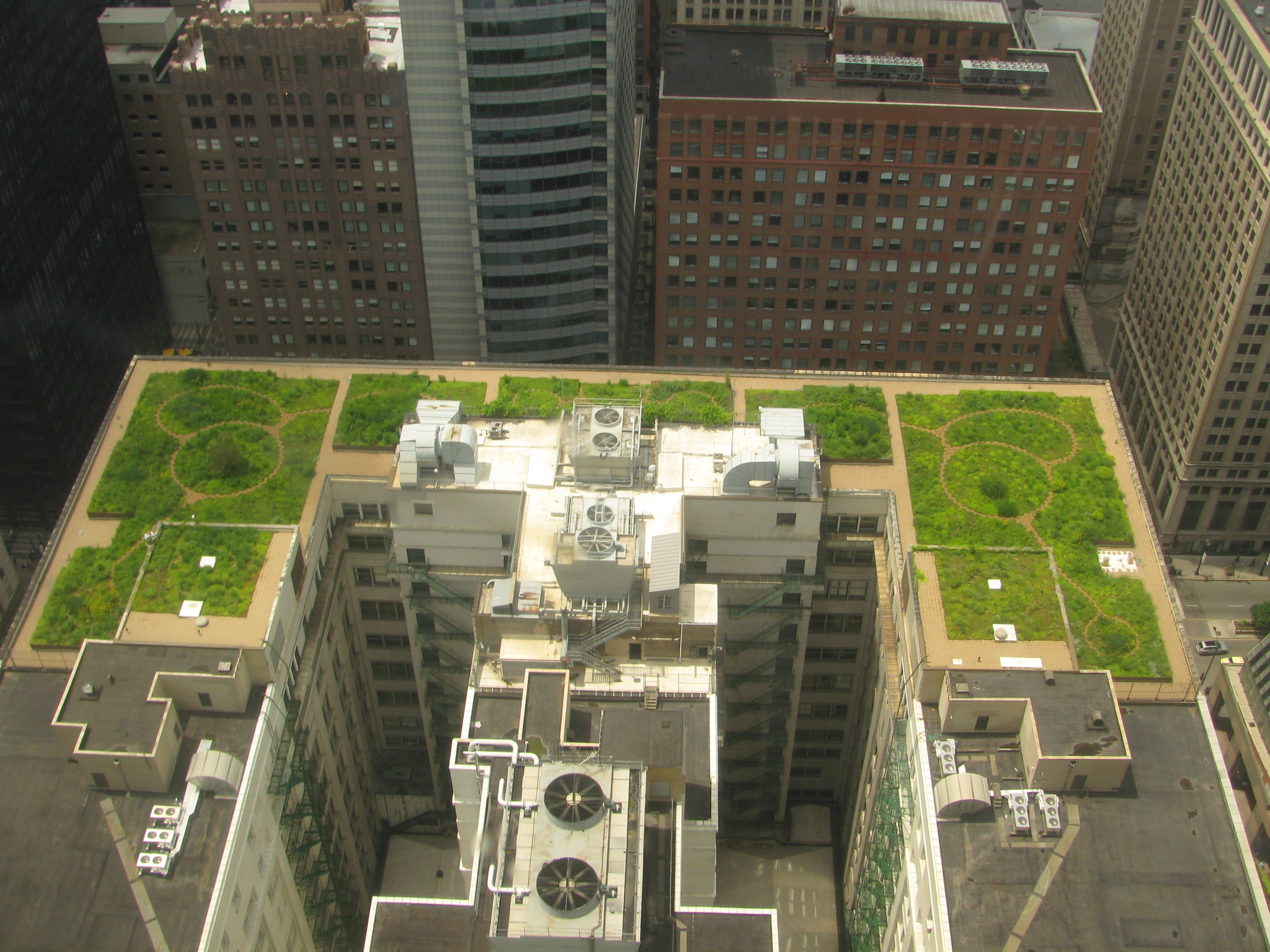
Green roof of Chicago City Hall.

Building resilience in cities relies on making investment decisions that prioritize funding activities that offer alternatives suitable for variable future conditions. Such decisions need to take into account future risks and uncertainties as risk can never be fully eliminated; emergency and disaster planning is crucial. Improvements in disaster risk management, for example, offer practical opportunities for enhancing resilience.

As of 2007, more than half of the world's human population lived in cities, and urbanization is calculated to rise to 80% by 2050. The growing urbanization over the past century has been associated with a considerable increase in urban sprawl. Resilience efforts address not only how individuals, communities and businesses cope with multiple shocks and stresses, but also exploit opportunities for transformational development.

One way that national and local governments address disaster risk in urban areas, often supported by international funding agencies, is through resettlement. This can be preventative or occur after a disaster. While resettlement reduces people's exposure to hazards, it can lead to other problems, leaving people more vulnerable or living in worse conditions than they were. Resettlement needs to be understood as part of long-term sustainable development, not just as a means of disaster risk reduction.

== Sustainable Development Goal 11 ==
In September 2015, world leaders adopted the 17 Sustainable Development Goals (SDGs) as part of the 2030 Agenda for Sustainable Development. The goals, which build on and replace the Millennium Development Goals, officially came into force on 1 January 2016 and are expected to be achieved within the next 15 years. While the SDGs are not legally binding, governments are expected to take ownership and establish national frameworks for their achievement. Countries also have the primary responsibility for follow-up and review of progress based on accessible, timely, and high quality data. National reviews of regional progress will provide information on global progress of the initiative.

== Medellin Collaboration for Urban Resilience ==
The Medellin Collaboration for Urban Resilience (MCUR) was launched in 2014 at the 7th session of the World Urban Forum in Medellín, Colombia. As a pioneering partnership platform, the MCUR gathers the most prominent actors committed to building resilience globally, including the United Nations Office for Disaster Risk Reduction (UNDRR), The World Bank Group, Global Facility for Disaster Reduction and Recovery, Inter-American Development Bank, Rockefeller Foundation, 100 Resilient Cities, C40, ICLEI and Cities Alliance, and it is chaired by UN-Habitat.

MCUR aims to jointly collaborate on strengthening the resilience of all cities and human settlements around the world by supporting local, regional and national governments through provision of knowledge and research, facilitating access to local-level finance, and raising global awareness on urban resilience through policy advocacy and adaptation diplomacy efforts. Its work is devoted to achieving the main international development agendas set out in the Sustainable Development Goals, the New Urban Agenda, the Paris Agreement on Climate Change and the Sendai Framework for Disaster Risk Reduction.

The MCUR helps local governments and municipal professionals understand the primary utility of the vast array of tools and diagnostics designed to assess, measure, monitor and improve city-level resilience. For example, some tools are intended as rapid assessments to establish a general understanding and baseline of a city's resilience and can be self-deployed, while others are intended as a means to identify and prioritize areas for investment. The Collaboration has produced a guidebook to illustrate how cities are responding to current and future challenges by thinking strategically about design, planning, and management for building resilience. Currently, it is working in a collaborative model in six pilot cities: Accra, Bogotá, Jakarta, Maputo, Mexico City and New York City.

== 100 Resilient cities and the City Resilience Index (CRI) ==
A central program contributing to the achievement of SDG 11 is the Rockefeller Foundation's 100 Resilient Cities. In December 2013, The Rockefeller Foundation launched this initiative, which is dedicated to promoting urban resilience, defined as "the capacity of individuals, communities, institutions, businesses, and systems within a city to survive, adapt, and grow no matter what kinds of chronic stresses and acute shocks they experience".

The professional services firm Arup has helped the Rockefeller Foundation develop the City Resilience Index (CRI) based on extensive stakeholder consultation across a range of cities globally. The CRI is intended as a planning and decision-making tool to help guide urban investments toward results that facilitate sustainable urban growth and the well-being of citizens. The hope is that city officials will utilize the tool to identify areas of improvement, systemic weaknesses and opportunities for mitigating risk. Its generalizable format also allows cities to learn from each other.

The CRI is a holistic articulation of urban resilience premised on the finding that there are 12 universal factors or drivers that contribute to city resilience. The factors vary in importance and are organized into four core dimensions of urban resilience

A total of 100 cities across six continents have signed up for the Rockefeller Center's urban resilience challenge. All 100 cities have developed individual City Resilience Strategies with technical support from a Chief Resilience Officer (CRO). The CRO ideally reports directly to the city's chief executive and helps coordinate all the resilience efforts in a single city.

Medellin in Colombia qualified for the urban resilience challenge in 2013. In 2016, it won the Lee Kuan Yew World City Prize.

== Urban governance ==
A core factor enabling progress on all dimensions of urban resilience is urban governance. Sustainable, resilient and inclusive cities are often the product of good governance, particularly including effective leadership, inclusive citizen participation, and efficient financing. Public officials also require access to robust data, enabling evidence-based decision making. Open data improves the ability of local governments to share information with citizens, deliver services, and monitor performance. Increased public access to information facilitates more direct citizen involvement in decision-making.

=== Digital technologies ===
As part of their resilience strategies, city governments are increasingly relying on digital technology as part of a city's infrastructure and service delivery systems. This is not without risk: reliance on digital technologies and electronic service delivery has made cities more vulnerable to phone hacking and cyber-attacks. However, information technologies have had a positive impact by supporting innovation and promoting efficiencies in urban infrastructure, thus leading to lower-cost city services. The deployment of new technologies in the initial construction of infrastructure have in some cases even allowed urban economies to leapfrog stages of development. An unintended outcome of the growing digitization of cities is the emergence of a digital divide, which can exacerbate inequality between well-connected affluent neighborhoods and business districts and under-serviced and under-connected low-income neighborhoods. In response, a number of cities have introduced digital inclusion programs to ensure that all citizens have the necessary tools to thrive in an increasingly digitized world.

== Climate change ==
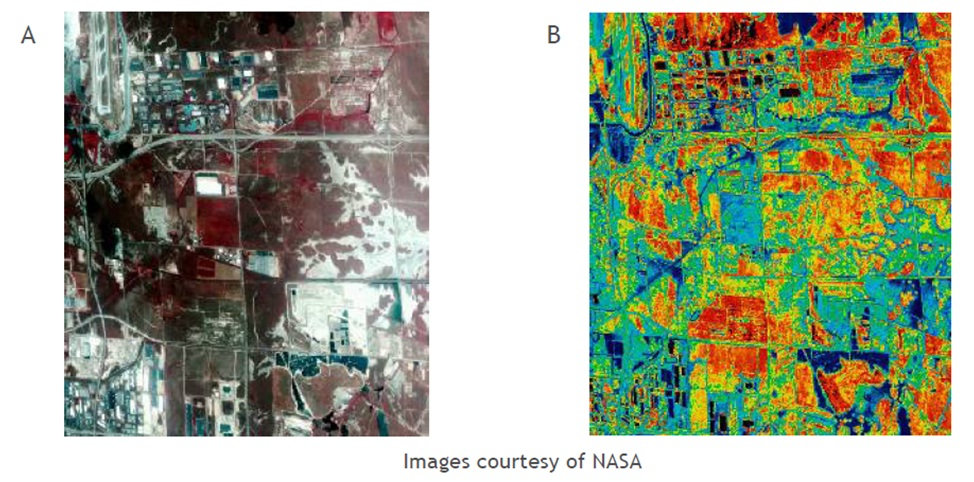
Images of Salt Lake City, show positive correlation between white reflective roofs and cooler temperatures. Image A depicts an aerial view of Salt Lake City, Utah, site of 865000 sqft white reflective roof. Image B is a thermal infrared image of same area, showing hot (red and yellow) and cool (green and blue) spots. The reflective vinyl roof, not absorbing solar radiation, is shown in blue surrounded by other hot spots.

The urban impacts of climate change vary widely geographically and across levels of development. A recent study of 616 cities (home to 1.7 billion people, with a combined GDP of US$35 trillion, half of the world's total economic output), found that floods endanger more city residents than any other natural peril, followed by earthquakes and storms. Below is an attempt to define and discuss the challenges of heat waves, droughts and flooding. Resilience-boosting strategies will be introduced and outlined.

=== Heat waves and droughts ===
Heat waves are becoming increasingly prevalent as the global climate changes. The 1980 United States heat wave and drought killed 10,000 people. In 1988 a similar heat wave and drought killed 17,000 American citizens. In August 2003 Europe saw record-breaking summer temperatures with average temperatures persistently rising above 32 °C. In the UK, nearly 3,000 deaths were attributed to the heat wave during this period, with an increase of 42% in London alone, and the heat wave claimed more than 40,000 lives across Europe. Research indicates that by 2040 over 50% of summers will be warmer than 2003 and by 2100 those same summer temperatures will be considered cool. The 2010 northern hemisphere summer heat wave was also disastrous, with nearly 5,000 deaths occurring in Moscow. In addition to deaths, extended periods of heat and droughts also widespread crop losses, spikes in electricity demand, forest fires, air pollution, and reduced biodiversity in vital land and marine ecosystems. Agricultural losses from heat and drought might not occur directly within the urban area, but resulting crop shortages can lead to spikes in food prices, food scarcity, civic unrest and even starvation in extreme cases. Direct fatalities from heat waves and droughts tend to be concentrated in urban areas, due to increased population density, social factors, and the urban heat island effect.

=== Urban heat islands ===
Urban heat island (UHI) refers to the presence of an inner-city microclimate in which temperatures are higher than those in surrounding rural areas. Recent studies have shown that summer daytime temperatures can be up to 9 °C hotter in a city center than in rural areas and between 5–6 °C warmer at night. UHIs are primarily due to simple energy balances and geometrics. Building materials commonly found in urban areas (concrete and asphalt) absorb and store heat much more effectively than natural materials. The black color of asphalt surfaces (roads, parking lots and highways) absorbs more radiative energy than other colors, capturing significant amounts of energy, which are partitioned primarily as sensible heat. The geometry of urban buildings comes into play as well, as tall buildings provide large surfaces that both absorb solar radiation and reflect it onto other absorbent surfaces. Due to a reduced sky view factor (which accounts for the amount of surface area facing the sky), they are less effective at radiating heat back into the atmosphere at night. These tall buildings also block the wind, which limits convective cooling. These factors, combined with the heat generated from vehicles, air conditioners, and industry ensure that cities create, absorb and hold heat very effectively.

=== Social factors for heat vulnerability ===
The physical causes of heat waves and droughts and the exacerbation of the UHI effect are only part of the equation in terms of fatalities; social factors play a role as well. Statistically, senior citizens represent the majority of heat (and cold) related deaths within urban areas. Elderly individuals commonly experience comorbidity, chronic illness, and drug-interactions that impair their body's ability to thermoregulate, increasing their heat vulnerability. This increased heat-related mortality among the elderly population is associated with social isolation common in urban environments. In rural areas, seniors are more likely to live with family or in care homes, whereas in cities they are often concentrated in subsidized apartment buildings and in many cases have little to no contact with the outside world. Despite the perception of heat, older adults in urban environments were unlikely to use air conditioning even when owning the technology. This combination of factors leads to thousands of tragic deaths every season, and the incidence is increasing each year. Gender, combined with age, has been shown to contribute to risk for heat-related morbidity and mortality. Poverty among older women above the age of sixty-five and living in urban environments limits access to energy use, cooling resources, or air conditioning, increasing the heat-related health risk among this population. Although elderly populations are uniquely vulnerable to heat-related health risks, children also possess increased heat-related health risk because they rely upon caregivers for protection.

Beyond age, other social factors including race and socioeconomic status impact heat vulnerability. Specifically, low-income communities and communities of color have higher rates of heat-related mortality in urban metropolitan regions because of structural inequities that limit access to healthcare or climate-adaptive resources. Low-income urban communities further experience greater heat vulnerability due to the building-dense built environment and minimal vegetation that increase heat exposure combined with elevated human activity, traffic congestion, and energy-use that increase heat emissions in these areas. Communities that lack access to walkable public cooling centers, such as malls, grocery stores, or other public buildings, experience greater heat-related mortality. Reduced educational attainment, which is commonly linked to lower socioeconomic status, is positively associated with increased heat vulnerability. Occupation also impacts vulnerability to heat-related illness; work involving outdoor labor, agriculture, or in-door confined spaces such as kitchen work were associated with greater risk compared to other, often higher-wage, occupations.

=== Adapting for heat and drought resilience ===
==== Greening, reflecting and whitening urban spaces ====
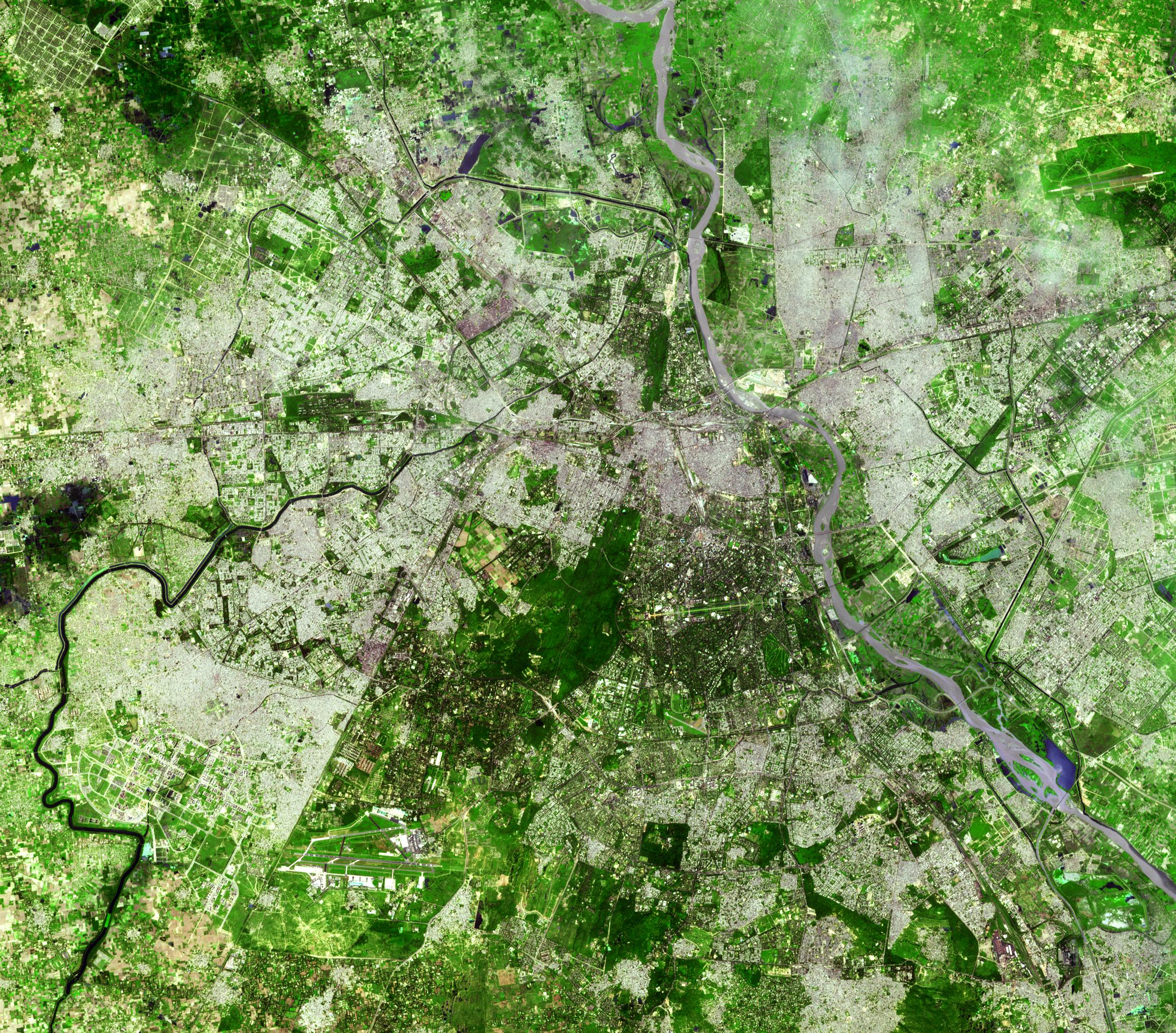
An aerial view of Delhi, India where urban forests are being developed to improve the weather resistance and climate resilience of the city

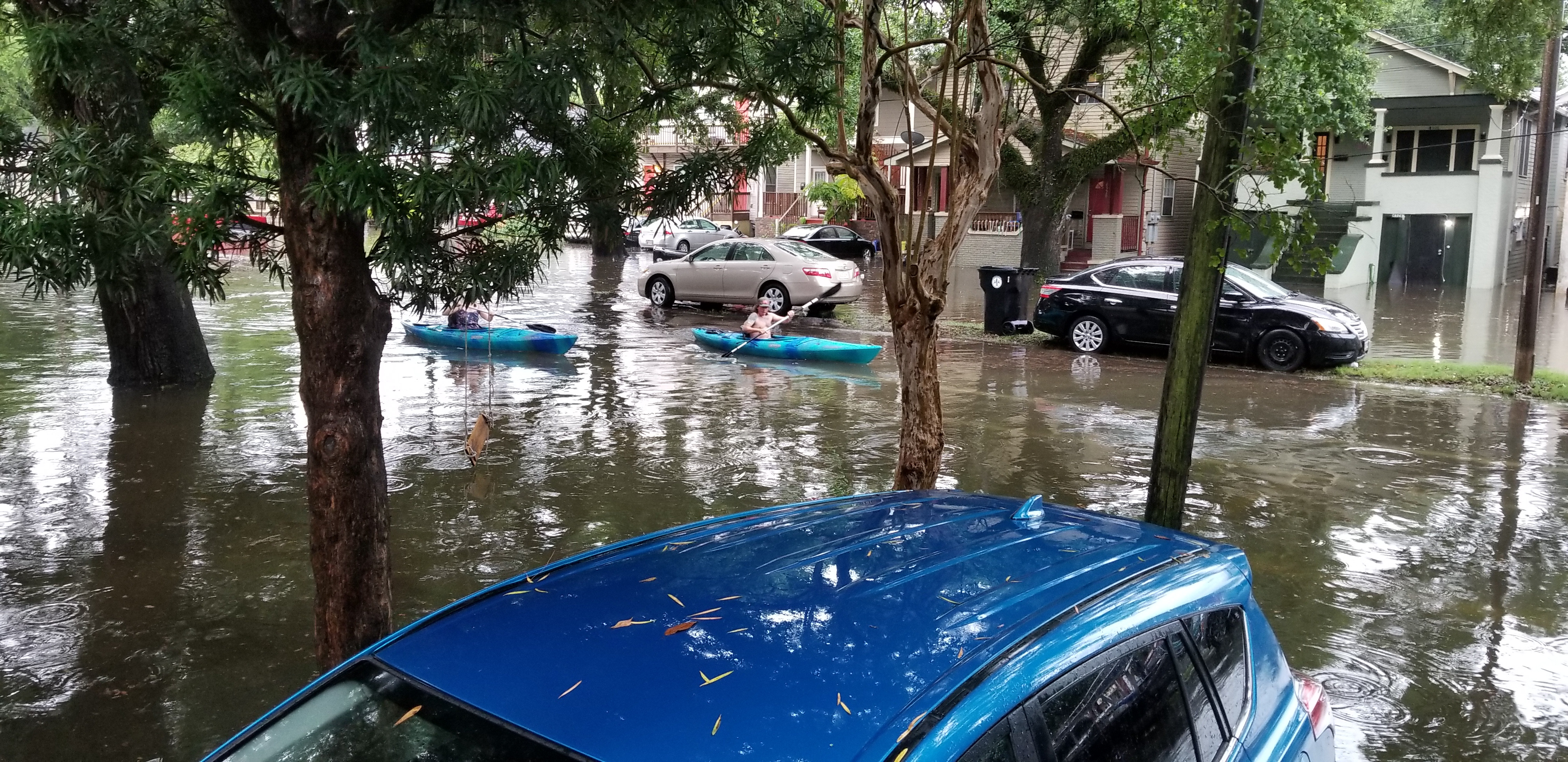
People kayaking down a street in Mid-City New Orleans following flooding in 2019

Greening urban spaces is among the most frequently mentioned strategies to address heat effects. The idea is to increase the amount of natural cover within the city. This cover can be made up of grasses, bushes, trees, vines, water, rock gardens; any natural material. Covering as much surface as possible with greenery will both reduce the total quantity of thermally absorbent artificial material, and by creating shade, will reduce the amount of light and heat that reaches the concrete and asphalt that cannot be replaced by greenery.

Trees are among the most effective greening tool within urban environments because of their coverage/footprint ratio. Trees require a very small physical area for planting, but when mature, they provide a much larger coverage area. Trees absorb solar energy for photosynthesis (improving air quality and mitigating global warming), reducing the amount of energy being trapped and held within artificial surfaces, and also cast much-needed shade on the city and its inhabitants. Shade itself does not lower the ambient air temperature, but it greatly reduces the perceived temperature and comfort of those seeking its refuge.

An increasingly popular method of preventing the urban heat island (UHI) is to increase the albedo (light reflectiveness). This can be done by using reflective paints or materials where appropriate, or white and light colored paints. Glazing can also be added to windows to reduce the amount of heat that buildings or roofs generate and store.

Green roofs also help reduce the urban heat island effect and improve the resilience to urban flooding. Restoring ponds and lakes and other types of urban open water can also help as shown by Beijing, China's "Dragon-shaped Lake". De-paving urban footpaths and roads has also been found to be effective in urban flood control, and may be a more cost-efficient approach.

==== Social strategies ====
There are various strategies to increase the resilience of those most vulnerable to urban heat waves, primarily socially isolated seniors, but also young children (especially those facing abject poverty or living in informal housing), people with underlying health problems, disabled people, and the homeless. Accurate and early prediction of heat waves is of fundamental importance, as it gives time for the government to issue extreme heat alerts. Urban areas must prepare and be ready to implement heat-wave emergency response initiatives. Seasonal campaigns aimed to educate the public on the risks associated with heat waves will help prepare the broad community, but in response to impending heat events more direct action is required.

Local government must quickly communicate with the groups and institutions that work with heat-vulnerable populations. Cooling centers should be opened in libraries, community centers and government buildings. These centers ensure free access to air conditioning and water. In partnership with government and non-government social services, paramedics, police, firefighters, nurses and volunteers; the above-mentioned groups working with vulnerable populations should carry out regular door-to-door visits during these extreme heat scenarios. These visits should provide risk assessment, advice, bottled water (for areas without potable tap water) and the offer of free transportation to local cooling centers.

==== Food and water supplies ====
Heat waves and droughts can cause massive damage to agricultural areas vital to providing food staples to urban populations. Reservoirs and aquifers quickly dry up due to increased demand on water for drinking, industrial and agricultural purposes. The result can be food shortages and price spikes, and increasingly, shortages of drinking water as observed with increasing severity seasonally in China and throughout most of the developing world. From an agricultural standpoint, farmers can be encouraged to plant more heat and drought-resistant crops. Agricultural practices can also be modified to higher levels of hydrological efficiency. Reservoirs should be expanded and new reservoirs and water towers should be constructed in areas facing critical shortages. Grander schemes of damming and redirecting rivers should also be considered if possible. For saltwater coastal cities, desalination plants provide a possible solution to water shortages. Infrastructure improvements may also enhance resilience, as in many areas aging pipelines result in leakage and possible contamination of drinking water. In Kenya's major cities, Nairobi and Mombasa, between 40 and 50% of drinking water is lost through leakage. In such cases, replacements and repairs are clearly needed.

== Flooding ==
Flooding, either from weather events, rising sea levels or infrastructure failures are a major cause of death, disease and economic losses throughout the world. Climate change and rapidly expanding urban settlements are two factors that increase occurrence and severity of urban flooding, especially in the developing world. Storm surges can affect coastal cities and are caused by low pressure weather systems, like cyclones and hurricanes. Flash floods and river floods can affect any city within a floodplain or with inadequate drainage infrastructure. These can be caused by large quantities of rain or heavy rapid snow melt. With all forms of flooding, cities are more vulnerable because of the large quantity of paved and concrete surfaces; these impermeable surfaces cause massive amounts of runoff that can quickly overwhelm the limited infrastructure of storm drains, flood canals and intentional floodplains. Many cities in the developing world simply have no infrastructure whatsoever to redirect floodwaters. Around the world, floods kill thousands of people every year and are responsible for billions of dollars in damages and economic losses. In cities with poor or absent drainage infrastructure, flooding can also lead to the contamination of drinking water sources (aquifers, wells, inland waterways) with salt water, chemical pollution, and most frequently, viral and bacterial contaminants. Flooding, much like heat waves and droughts, can also wreak havoc on agricultural areas, quickly destroying large amounts of crops.

=== Flood flow in urban environment ===
The flood flow in urbanized areas constitutes a hazard to population and infrastructure. Some recent catastrophes included the inundations of Vaison-la-Romaine (France) in 1992, Nîmes (France) in 1998, New Orleans (USA) in 2005, and the flooding in Rockhampton, Bundaberg, and Brisbane in Queensland (Australia) during the summer of 2010–2011. Flood flows in urban environments have been studied only relatively recently despite many centuries of flood events. Several studies looked into the flow patterns and redistribution in streets during storm events and the implication in terms of flood modelling.

Some research considered the criteria for safe evacuation of individuals in flooded areas. But some recent field measurements during the 2010–2011 Queensland floods showed that any criterion solely based upon the flow velocity, water depth or specific momentum cannot fully account for all the hazards due to flooding as they do not take into account risks associated with large debris entrained by the flow.

=== Adapting for flood resilience ===
==== Urban greening ====
Replacing as much non-porous surface as possible with greenery will allow the ground and plants to help absorb excess water. Green roofs are gaining popularity; they vary from very thin layers of soil or rockwool supporting a variety of low or no-maintenance mosses or sedum species to large, deep, intensive roof gardens capable of supporting large plants and trees but requiring regular maintenance and significant structural support. The deeper the soil, the more rainwater it can absorb and therefore the more potential floodwater it can prevent from reaching the ground.

One of the best strategies, if possible, is to simply create enough space for the excess water by expanding areas of parkland in or adjacent to the zone where flooding is most likely to occur. Excess water is diverted into these areas when necessary, as in Cardiff, Wales around the new Millennium Stadium and at the main Olympic site in Beijing, China .

Floodplain clearance is another greening strategy that involves removing structures and pavement built on floodplains and returning the area to its natural habitat which is capable of absorbing massive quantities of water that otherwise would have flooded the built-up urban area.

==== Flood-water control ====
Levees and other flood barriers are indispensable for cities on floodplains or along rivers and coasts. In areas with lower financial and engineering capital, there are cheaper and simpler options for flood barriers. UK engineers are currently conducting field tests of a new technology called the SELOC (Self-Erecting Low-Cost Barrier). The barrier itself lies flat on the ground, and as the water rises, the SELOC floats up, with its top edge rising with the water level. A restraint holds the barrier in the vertical position. This simple, inexpensive flood barrier has great potential for increasing urban resilience to flood events and shows significant promise for developing nations with its low cost and simple, fool-proof design. The creation or expansion of flood canals and/or drainage basins can help direct excess water away from critical areas and the utilization of innovative porous paving materials on city streets and car parks allow for the absorption and filtration of excess water.

During the January 2011 flood of the Brisbane River (Australia), some unique field measurements about the peak of the flood showed very substantial sediment fluxes in the Brisbane River flood plain, consistent with the murky appearance of floodwaters.

==== Structural resilience ====
In most developed nations, all new developments are assessed for flood risks. The aim is to ensure flood risk is taken into account in all stages of the planning process to avoid inappropriate development in areas of high risk. When development is required in areas of high risk, structures should be built to flood-resistant standards and living or working areas should be raised well above the worst-case scenario flood levels. For existing structures in high-risk areas, funding should be allocated to remediation, for example raising electrical wiring/sockets so any water that enters the home can not reach the electrics. Other solutions are to raise structures to appropriate heights or make them floating; as a last resort, considerations should be made to relocate or rebuild structures on higher ground. A house in Mexico Beach, Florida which survived Hurricane Michael is an example of a house built to survive tidal surge.

The pre-Incan Uru people of Lake Titicaca in Peru have lived on floating islands made of reeds for hundreds of years. The practice began as an innovative form of protection from competition for land by various groups, and it continues to support the Uru homeland. The manual technique is used to build homes resting on hand-made islands all from simple reeds from the totora plant. Similarly, in the southern wetlands of Iraq, the Marsh Arabs (Arab al-Ahwār) have lived for centuries on floating islands and in arched buildings all constructed exclusively from local qasab reeds. Without any nails, wood, or glass, buildings are assembled by hand as quickly as within a day; such homes can also be disassembled in a day, transported, and reassembled.

==== Emergency response ====
As with all disasters, flooding requires a specific set of disaster response plans. Various levels of contingency planning should be established, from basic medical and selective evacuation provisions involving local emergency responders all the way up to full military disaster relief plans involving air-based evacuations, search and rescue teams, and provisions for relocation of entire urban populations. Clear lines of responsibility and chains of command must be laid out, and tiered priority response levels should be established to address the immediate needs of the most vulnerable citizens first. Sufficient emergency funding should be set aside for post-flooding repair and reconstruction.

== World education and research relating to urban resilience ==
The United States

Urban resilience as an educational topic in the USA has experienced an unprecedented level of growth due in large part to a series of natural disasters including the 2004 Indian Ocean earthquake and tsunami, 2005 Hurricane Katrina, the 2011 Tohoku earthquake and tsunami, and Hurricane Sandy in 2012. Two of the more well-recognized programs are Harvard Graduate School of Design's Master's program in Risk and Resilience, and Tulane University's Disaster Resilience Leadership Academy. There are also several workshops available related to the U.S. Federal Emergency Management Agency and the Department of Homeland Security.

China

China's resilient cities research started relatively late, involving theories, scholars, and disciplines mostly from the United States. However, with the establishment of China's Ministry of Emergency Management and the country's deepening awareness of and emphasis on earthquake prevention and mitigation, related research and institutions have developed rapidly. A number of universities, including Zhejiang University's Ren Center for Resilience, have made significant contributions to the promotion and application of resilient cities concepts in China.

Challenges with further mainstreaming of urban resilience approaches

There are at least three key challenges to further mainstreaming innovative approaches to urban resilience. First, urban development systems have tended to see urban resilience schemes as public projects entailing a significant burden on the state to finance, plan and manage them. This is a classic problem of externalities, in which private developers are too often not required to bear the costs of remediating the consequences of their activities. Second, urban planning regulations typically do not require urban resilience measures in the same way they require fire detection and suppression or road access. Third, too many professionals in urban design, engineering and the environmental sciences lack awareness of innovative approaches to resilience and so cannot practice them.

== See also ==
- Co-benefits of climate change mitigation
- Energy security
- Human-powered transport – Transport of goods and/or people only using human muscles
- New Urbanism
- Sustainable urbanism
- Urban vitality
- Waste management#United States
