= Feinstein International Center =

Humanitarian organization

- Formation: 1995
- Type: Non-profit
- Purpose: World hunger, humanitarian crises, and famine
- Location(s): Tufts University; 150 Harrison Ave, Boston, MA 02111
- Product: Research and education
- Director: Paul Howe
- Website: fic.tufts.edu
- Formerly called: Feinstein International Famine Center

The Feinstein International Center (FIC) is a research and teaching center based at the Friedman School of Nutrition Science and Policy at Tufts University. The center's mission is to protect and strengthen the lives, livelihoods, and dignity of people affected by or at risk of hunger or humanitarian crises.

== History ==
The center was founded in 1995 as the Tufts International Famine Center on the 150th anniversary of the Irish Potato Famine. The center was conceived by Jean Mayer, the tenth president of Tufts University and a renowned nutritionist, and brought to fruition by Irwin Rosenberg, who launched the center as a joint effort with the University of Cork. In 1997, the center was renamed the Feinstein International Famine Center following a landmark gift from Rhode Island philanthropist Alan Shawn Feinstein. The center changed its name to the Feinstein International Center in 2006 to better reflect the broad and expanding range of its work.

== Research ==
The Feinstein International Center addresses world hunger, humanitarian crises, and their intersection in famine through research, education, and partnerships.

Its areas of expertise include:

- Climate risk management, anticipatory action, early warning, and early action
- Food security, famine, and malnutrition
- Human migration and refugees
- Humanitarian response
- Livelihoods and pastoralism
- Protection of women and children affected by armed conflict

Feinstein International Center faculty and researchers work with local partners across the globe to conduct in-depth quantitative and qualitative research and longitudinal studies. They share their work with crises-affected communities, policymakers, and practitioners by publishing research reports and peer-reviewed journal articles, and hosting events and webinars.

== Courses and degrees at Tufts University ==
Feinstein International Center faculty teach at the Friedman School of Nutrition Science and Policy and the Fletcher School of Law and Diplomacy at Tufts University, where they advise masters and doctoral students.

Courses include:

- Climate Change: Risk and Adaptation in Food Systems and Beyond, taught by Erin Coughlan de Perez
- Famines and Severe Food Insecurity, taught by Merry Fitzpatrick
- Gender and Intersectionality in Humanitarian Assistance, taught by Dyan Mazurana
- Humanitarian Action: Past, Present, and Future, taught by Kimberly Howe
- International Humanitarian Response, taught by Paul Howe
- Statistical Methods for Nutrition Science and Policy, taught by Anastasia Marshak

The Feinstein International Center administers a Master of Science in Nutrition degree with a specialization in Humanitarian Assistance, offered by the Friedman School of Nutrition Science and Policy. The degree program, which is available both on campus and online, is evolved from the former Master of Arts in Humanitarian Assistance (MAHA) program.
