= Humanitarian crisis =

Large threat to the health and safety of many people

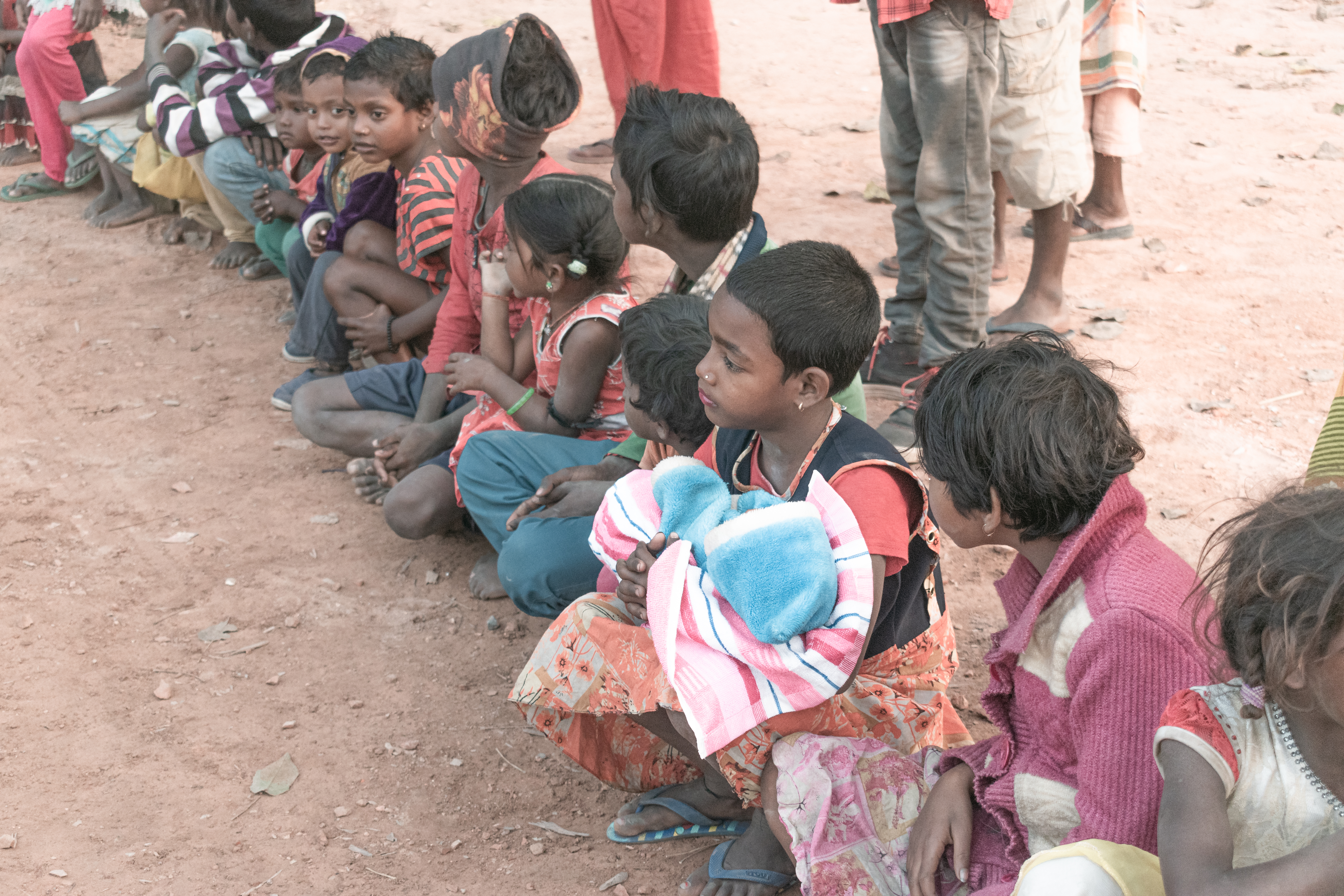
Humanitarian crisis in West Bengal

A humanitarian crisis (or sometimes humanitarian disaster) is defined as a singular event or a series of events that are threatening in terms of health, safety or well-being of a community or large group of people. It may be an internal or external conflict and usually occurs throughout a large land area. Local, national and international responses are necessary in such events.

Each humanitarian crisis is caused by different factors and as a result, each different humanitarian crisis requires a unique response targeted towards the specific sectors affected. This can result in either short-term or long-term damage. Humanitarian crises can either be natural disasters, human-made disasters or complex emergencies. In such cases, complex emergencies occur as a result of several factors or events that prevent a large group of people from accessing their fundamental needs, such as food, clean water or safe shelter.

Common causes of humanitarian crises are wars, epidemics, famine, natural disasters, energy crises and other major emergencies. If a crisis causes large movements of people it could also become a refugee crisis. For these reasons, humanitarian crises are often interconnected and complex and several national and international agencies play roles in the repercussions of the incidences.

== Categories ==
There is no simple categorization of humanitarian crises. Different communities and agencies tend to have definitions related to the concrete situations they face. A local fire service will tend to focus on issues such as flooding and weather induced crises. Medical and health related organizations are naturally focused on sudden crises to the health of a community.

Humanitarian crisis may arise from both natural and human-made conflicts and disasters. Humanitarian crisis from natural disasters include tsunami, earthquake, hurricane, floods, droughts, and wildfires that may result in disruption through damage to property, physical injury and death, psychological distress, displacement of individuals and families, and prolonged disruption in normal daily activities. On the other hand, crisis from manmade disasters such as wars, social unrest, protests, conflicts, and terrorist attacks have a broad range of impacts on the physical, mental, and social well-being of the individuals affected.

An ongoing or lingering pandemic may amount to a humanitarian crisis, especially where there are increasing levels of virulence, or rates of infection as in the case of AIDS, bird flu or tuberculosis. Major health-related problems such as cancer, global warming typically require an accentuated or punctuated mass-event to justify a label of "crisis" or "disaster".

The International Federation of Red Cross and Red Crescent Societies (IFRC) lists categories which include different types of natural disasters, technological disasters (i.e. hazardous material spills, Chernobyl-type nuclear accidents, chemical explosions) and long-term human-made disasters related to "civil strife, civil war and international war". Internationally, the humanitarian response sector has tended to distinguish between natural disasters and complex emergencies which are related to armed conflict and wars.

== Impacts ==
=== Women's social status in humanitarian crises ===
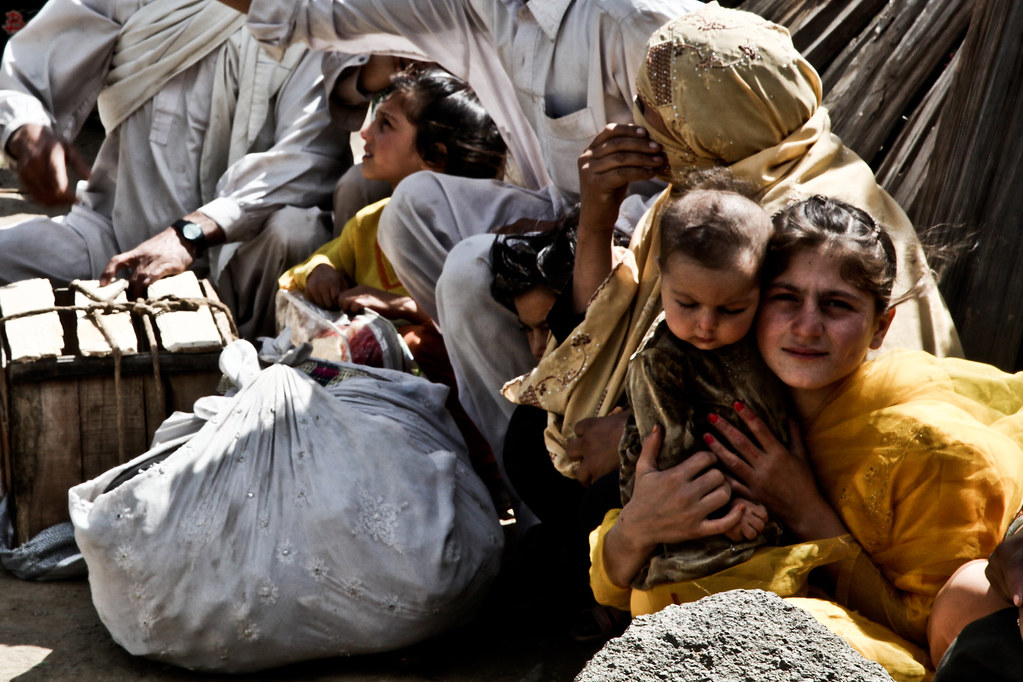
Female refugees sitting on the ground in Pakistan.

Socially, women and children (mostly girls) receive a significantly decreased amount of attention in response to humanitarian crises. Women and children make up 3 quarters of refugees or displaced persons at risk post-crisis. A quarter of this population is of reproduction age and a fifth of this population is likely to be pregnant. In times of emergency and such crises, deaths associated with pregnancy, reproductive health, sexual violence and sexual exploitation increase drastically especially amongst females. During such emergencies, women lose access to family planning services, prenatal care, postpartum care and other health services. The heightened risk of female health and safety makes them vulnerable to disease, violence and death.

Non-profit organizations such as the Women's Refugee Commission deal with aiding particularly women suffering from various types of humanitarian crises. According to the Women's Refugee Commission, during the first hours of a humanitarian crisis, women and young children are at most risk. During such an event, agencies and organizations approach matters variably. However, the top critical requirements within hours and months of the crises include: keeping the refugees and internally displaced persons away from danger, allowing access to fundamental needs such as food and healthcare, identification information, preventing sexual violence and others.

=== Socio-economic realities of humanitarian crises ===
Economic issues can lead to humanitarian crises or humanitarian crises can lead to economic downfalls. If it occurs after a humanitarian crisis affects a nation, it is imperative to return the livelihoods in the economic settings of the nation. One of the critical needs on the Women's Refugee Commission's list is providing education and economic opportunities in order to maintain the economic qualities of the region. It is done by using the skills of the displaced persons or refugees involved to provide them with opportunities to gain income.

If it occurs as a cause of humanitarian crisis, the society would have been in a state of civil insecurity and economic shortfalls, which could cause the government to collapse. This can also result from food insecurity, famines, corruptions and various other issues. Direct effects of this situation include human rights violations, violence and mass murders.

The El Niño weather pattern is expected to exacerbate hunger, displacement, and health risks globally. Governments and organizations like the UN Food and Agriculture Organization are focusing on anticipatory action and early response to mitigate the effects of climate-induced damage.

=== Environmental and ecological impacts ===
In the cases of humanitarian crises, especially natural disasters such as tornadoes, tsunamis and earthquakes, these incidences leave environmental and ecological impacts on the regions affected. The aftermaths of natural disasters can lead to a significant decrease in natural resources while making the region prone to future issues. For example, if a forest fire occurs in a large region, the area may be susceptible to air pollution, dust clouds, release of carcinogenic gases and others. Forest ecological wildlife, for example, is severely impacted by such events. In the cases of water natural disasters such as floods and tsunamis, extensive damage due to the water is prevalent. Fish, corals and other ocean life is impacted, which further impacts the livelihoods of fishermen.

According to the World Bank data, there is a worrying water scarcity in the Middle East and North Africa. The Stockholm International Water Institute emphasizes the need for urgent action in water policy, and suggests decentralizing decision-making to better manage the crisis.

=== Mental health impacts ===
Mental health impacts can cause additional concerns for populations affected by humanitarian crises. The World Health Organization (WHO) estimates that one in five individuals in a disaster-impacted population may already suffer from a mental health disorder that could then be exacerbated by the disaster context. Mental health disorders included in this estimate range from mild anxiety and/or depression to severe and persistent conditions like bipolar disorder and schizophrenia.

==== Acute mental health impacts ====
The stress of a humanitarian crisis can cause acute, or short-term, anxiety in the population of people affected. Humanitarian crises often displace people from their homes and cut off their access to resources, which affects their ability to meet their basic needs and creates significant anxiety. This acute anxiety may impact the population's capacity to care for themselves via the resources provided by humanitarian aid groups in the short-term. Acute mental health impacts can also hinder a population's recovery capacity in rebuilding after a crisis. Acute stress can exacerbate pre-existing conditions for individuals who already suffer from mental health disorders, making serious conditions like depression or schizophrenia more difficult to live with.

==== Chronic mental health impacts ====
If left untreated, acute mental health impacts from humanitarian crises can become chronic conditions. Large studies estimate that anywhere between 9 and 40% of refugee populations suffer from post-traumatic stress disorder (PTSD) brought on by the crisis that led to their refugee status. These studies also showed a significant proportion of crisis-affected populations (between 5 and 30%) experiencing depression. Though a few large studies have been conducted, research gaps exist in investigating chronic mental health impacts of humanitarian crises, which is why these estimates have so much variation. PTSD along with moderate to severe depression and anxiety can be life-long disorders without adequate and prompt treatment.

==== Responses ====
The WHO and the Inter-Agency Standing Committee (IASC) recommend that mental health care should be an integral part of emergency response during a humanitarian crisis. The type of mental health care provided can range and vary based on the context and resources but can include mental health first aid on the front lines, community support groups, and routine clinical mental health care. The WHO also recommends that countries enhance their mental healthcare systems outside of the context of a humanitarian crisis so that individuals affected by crises can have access to the care they need once the emergency response is over. A 2020 Cochrane review of psychological and social interventions for the prevention of mental disorders for individuals living in areas affected by humanitarian crisis found the need for better studies to determine the impact of interventions following a review of current studies. Research states that mental health is often neglected by first responders. Disaster can have lasting psychological impacts on those affected. When individuals are supported in processing their emotional experiences to the disaster this leads to increases in resilience, increases in the capacity to help others through crises, and increases in community engagement. When processing of emotional experiences is done in a collective manner, this leads to greater solidarity following disaster. As such, emotional experiences have an inherent adaptiveness within them, however the opportunity for these to be reflected on and processed is necessary for this growth to occur.

== Sustainable solutions ==
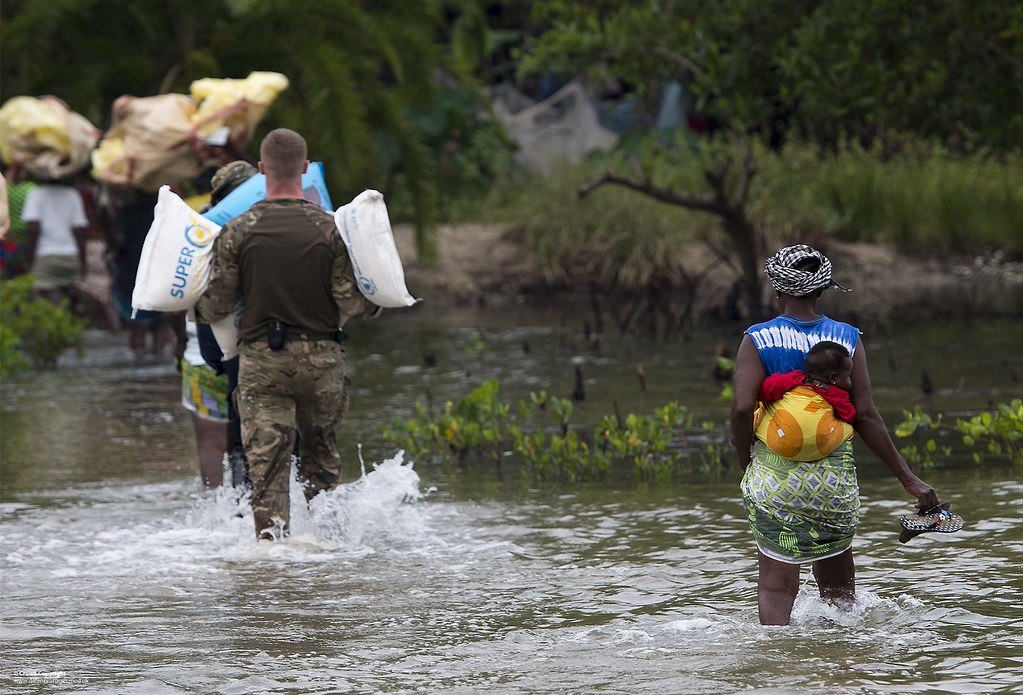
British humanitarian services bringing aid to a Sierra Leone village recovering from war.

There is no singular solution to any one humanitarian crisis. Often, the primary cause of a humanitarian crisis is intertwined with several other factors. Further, one repercussion can lead to another which may lead to another. For instance, in the case of a flood, fish and ocean life is impacted, an environmental and ecological impact. This can further impact humans the source of income for fishermen, an economical impact. This causes the residents of this particular area to be stripped from their source of food and their culture of consuming sea fish. This can lead to women and children being forced to work in dangerous conditions to gain income and food, a social impact. Evidently, one crisis can have many impacts that are interconnected with one another and there is no single solution. The Feinstein International Center at Tufts University works to understand and find solutions to the intersection of various factors that contribute to humanitarian crisis.

== Preparing for humanitarian crises ==
Disaster preparedness is critical to building both national and international capacity to prevent, respond to, and recover from humanitarian emergencies. Disaster preparedness activities can be categorized into material preparedness (building to code, avoiding building in hazardous areas, strengthening homes, preparing emergency kits, etc.) and into behavioral preparedness (training, early warning, disaster insurance, etc.). The international community possesses five key to key entities for guidance programming, research, and funding for disaster preparedness capacity-building:

- United Nations Office for Disaster Risk Reduction: The United Nations Office for Disaster Risk Reduction implements the United Nations International Strategy for Disaster Reduction (UNISDR). The UNISDR, led by the United Nations Special Representative of the Secretary General for Disaster Risk Reduction, serves, "…as the focal point in the United Nations system for the coordination of disaster reduction and to ensure synergies among disaster reduction activities". A component of UNISDR work is implementation of the Sendai Framework for Disaster Risk Reduction 2015–2030.
- International Federation of Red Cross and Red Crescent Societies: The IFRC operates around the globe and across all phases of the humanitarian programme cycle, helping affected nations by working with member National Societies and the international community to prepare for, respond to, and recover from "…natural and man-made disasters in non-conflict situations."
- Office for the Coordination of Humanitarian Affairs (OCHA): OCHA is a United Nations office, "…responsible for bringing together humanitarian actors to ensure a coherent response to emergencies." OCHA's leader operates as both the Under-Secretary-General for Humanitarian Affairs and as the Emergency Relief Coordinator, advocating for increased awareness of, preparedness for, and response to humanitarian emergencies worldwide. As the Emergency Relief Coordinator, the OCHA lead also chairs the Inter-Agency Standing Committee.
- Inter-Agency Standing Committee (IASC): The IASC provides a forum for both UN-affiliated and non-UN-affiliated organizations to coordinate action regarding humanitarian policies, advocacy, and response evaluation and improvement. In 2005, the IASC released its Transformative Agenda with 10 protocols to, "…improve the effectiveness of humanitarian response through greater predictability, accountability, responsibility and partnership". Protocol 8: "Common Framework for Preparedness" and Protocol 9: "Emergency Response Preparedness" provide guidance countries and humanitarians can implement for risk assessment and preparedness planning. Additionally, IASC also oversees global humanitarian clusters as a part of the Cluster Approach.
- Global Clusters: To aid coordination during the humanitarian programme cycle, the UN established the Cluster Approach. Clusters are groups of humanitarian organizations with explicit responsibilities for coordinating action within each humanitarian sector. Preparedness is fundamental to the Cluster Approach, with leaders within each global cluster working to build international capacity by developing standards, setting policy, and sharing leading practices for their sector before a humanitarian emergency occurs.

In addition to these five disaster preparedness entities, there is a multiplicity of government donor agencies that fund disaster preparedness activities, including the United States Agency for International Development (USAID), the United Kingdom's Department for International Development (DFID), the Swedish International Development Cooperation Agency (SIDA), and others. Additionally, there are many philanthropies that support disaster preparedness, such as the Bill & Melinda Gates Foundation.

== Humanitarian Crisis Management ==
=== NGOs and the management of human-made crises ===
Many actors are involved in the strategic management of humanitarian crises and emergencies. The United Nations (UN) serves as the primary international actor in humanitarian crisis oversight but has extended responsibilities and management roles to improve the efficiency of crisis responses. With the development of a cluster system, the UN's official organs have incorporated international organizations (IOs), international non-governmental organizations (INGOs), and non-governmental organizations (NGOs) into the coordination of crisis management.

By expanding the responsibility for humanitarian crises beyond the UN's singular authority, the number of actors involved in the coordination of the system has simultaneously increased. Requiring further attention to efficient cooperation in-between actors. Specifically, human-made crises, which differ from natural disasters in their fundamental origin of imposing humanitarian threats, create distinct challenges to appropriate crisis responses because of the new essence of conflicts. Today, conflicts are more frequently domestically fought rather than across national borders. Such development of crises has changed the ways humans are affected by conflict and asks for new response strategies to meet the needs of the people at risk. Thus, the multiple actors involved in human-made humanitarian crises, are faced with a challenging environment to establish efficient management and cooperation over the situation.

INGOs and NGOs are part of the clustered system of responsible actors in the management of humanitarian crises. They share organizational characteristics of a detachment from state association and a position of objectivity but differ in their level of operation. INGOs operate internationally, and NGOs pertain to a domestic level of activity. Non-governmental organizations overall have a non-profit structure, which means that they are solely providing services for the good of the population at risk and in need of assistance, without expectations of return benefits. Which allows them to focus on solidarity efforts in serving human needs and protecting human rights. The organizations are thus dependent on volunteers' investment in the shared vision of the entity. Their work also includes preventive efforts of serving as experts to deliver knowledge on management practices to the other actors. Additionally, by centering their work around a shared vision of establishing long-term peace through coordinated strategies of reconciliation and conflict assistance, they seek to efficiently fulfill their role in the humanitarian crisis management cluster.

The 2017 humanitarian crisis in Myanmar is an example that recognizes the unique position NGOs have and the responsibilities they serve in the international community. The crisis was acknowledged internationally when the ethnic group of the Rohingya had suffered from violent discrimination and denial of human rights for an extensive period. The Myanmar government prevented aid from both the UN and neighboring countries to support the ongoing crisis. Instead, the Indonesian government established a strategic cluster of cooperation between local NGOs in Indonesia and Myanmar. The alliance received the name of The Indonesian Humanitarian Alliance (AKIM) and provided relief to the exposed Rohingya people by getting around the barriers put in place by the Myanmar government. Several international NGOs were also involved in Myanmar to deliver appropriate relief. Their assistance allowed limited contact with the national government in Myanmar yet reached beneficial agreements with other local authorities, as well as established communication and cooperation with local NGOs and UN actors. However, because of the large number of actors involved in the crisis, the organizations faced challenges in the coordination between actors to provide efficient and non-coinciding crisis management.

In addition to the coordination aspect and its significance in humanitarian crisis management provided by NGOs, there is another potential strategy highlighting efficient communication to implement sufficient responses. NGOs often have to work with a diverse set of actors which may present challenges to efficient cooperation if expectations and goals divide across partnerships. To overcome obstacles within diverse interactions, NGOs may utilize three strategic environments of operation to establish efficient communication between parties. First, the "internal workplace" considers the diverse environment closely working with the NGOs, consisting of the organization's employees and volunteers from the crisis exposed area. Second, the "inter-organizational forum" addresses the communication line between the multiple NGOs assisting in the specific crisis, including the local authorities and the appropriate reporting to UN agencies. Last, "community relations" recognizes the multicultural dimension of the communication between NGO employees and the individuals at risk of the crisis. The communication and coordination between the various actors in humanitarian crises are essential components for ensuring security, limiting the conflict, and overall delivering efficient crisis management.

Besides the attention to efficient coordination of actors and the recognition of diverse environments of communication, NGOs can also adopt strategic thinking in their work with humanitarian crises. What identifies the approach of strategic thinking is an overarching awareness of the environment of the particular crisis and the context of the organization assisting. With a broader understanding of the needs of the people at risk, and what the organization wishes to accomplice with its work, there is a greater chance for a successful outcome for both parties. Strategic thinking, coordination of actors, and efficient communication in diverse environments are all potential strategies that NGOs can use on both international and local levels to address humanitarian crises. As each organization and crisis is different, there is no such thing as a perfect strategy to manage humanitarian crises across the board. Instead, it is suggested to use methods such as strategic thinking, coordination, and communication to develop a response that is suitable for the specific situation and allows for successful management of serving human needs and protecting human rights.

== See also ==
- Aid agency
- Central Emergency Response Fund
- Emergency management
- Human security
- Humanitarian aid
- Humanitarian intervention
- International humanitarian law
- List of droughts
- List of epidemics
- List of natural disasters by death toll
- Outline of war
- Responsibility to protect
- United Nations Office for the Coordination of Humanitarian Affairs
