= Food and Agriculture Policy Decision Analysis =

The Food and Agriculture Policy Decision Analysis (FAPDA) initiative, led by the Food and Agriculture Organization of the United Nations' Agricultural Development Economics Division, aims at promoting evidence-based decision making. FAPDA collects and disseminates information on food and agriculture policy decisions through a freely accessible web-based tool. It has been gathering information since 2008 from more than 80 countries. Between 2008 and 2016, more than 9000 policy decisions have been gathered on this web-based tool, which allows for policy trend identification and the analysis. At the country level, FAPDA focuses on developing information on policy trends and stability indicators for more transparent and effective policy-making.

Users can directly access and retrieve information by country or region, date and policy category. Ad hoc reports can also be produced on selected countries, type of policy or specific topic. They classify policies based on the Food and Agriculture Policy Classification that uses three categories: producer-oriented, consumer-oriented, and trade-oriented and macroeconomic policies, each with their own sub-categories. In August 2016, the tool was updated to include information on policy frameworks as well. Policy frameworks in the tool are classified according to the following broad categories: national socio-economic development, food security and nutrition, agriculture and rural development, social protection, natural resources, trade and markets, disaster risk reduction and management, and gender. This policy classification remains widely used, despite some criticisms, mostly for lack of mutual exclusivity of classes and the fact that the classification of policy frameworks is still incomplete
