= Global Facility for Disaster Reduction and Recovery =

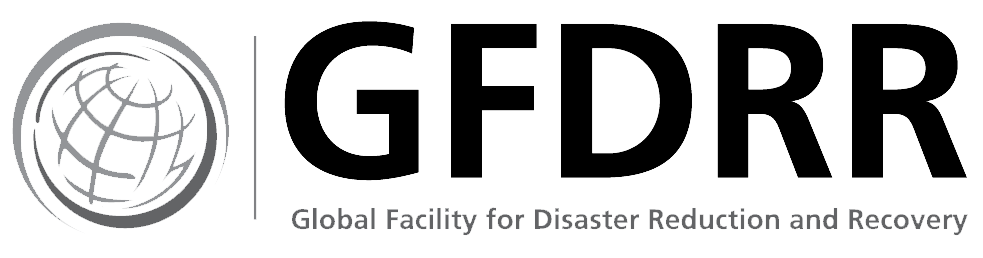
- Formation: September 29, 2006
- Type: Global Partnership
- Purpose: Disaster risk reduction,
- Headquarters: Washington D.C., U.S.
- Members: The current Members of the Consultative Group are World Bank Group, UNDRR, European Union, Organisation of African, Caribbean and Pacific States, Australia, Austria, Canada, Germany, India, Italy, Japan, Luxembourg, Norway, Serbia, Sweden, Switzerland, United States.
- Parent organization: World Bank
- Website: www.gfdrr.org

The Global Facility for Disaster Reduction and Recovery (GFDRR) is a global partnership program established on September 29, 2006, to support developing countries on disaster risk reduction and climate change adaptation. The facility is administered by the World Bank and governed by a Consultative Group including the World Bank Group, the United Nations Office for Disaster Risk Reduction (UNDRR) and several other international organizations and countries.

GFDRR was initially launched to support the implementation of the Hyogo Framework for Action 2005-2015 (HFA) approved during the Second World Conference on Disaster Reduction in 2005. On March 18, 2015, the Sendai Framework for Disaster Risk Reduction 2015-2030 (Sendai Framework) was adopted. GFDRR now supports the implementation of this framework.

== Programs and activities ==
GFDRR is a grant-funding mechanism allocating financing and providing technical assistance through thematic and country specific programs with a focus on disaster risk financial protection, resilient infrastructures, cities, hydromet services and access to disaster risk information. GFDRR is also the author of several publications discussing policy measures to mitigate disaster and climate risk.

== See also ==
- Disaster risk reduction
- Climate change adaptation
- Emergency management
- Natural disasterd
- Vulnerability
- Business continuity planning
- Climate change
- Risk management
