= World Conference on Disaster Risk Reduction =

Series of United Nations conferences

The World Conference on Disaster Risk Reduction is a series of United Nations conferences focusing on disaster and climate risk management in the context of sustainable development. The World Conference has been convened three times, with each edition to date having been hosted by Japan: in Yokohama in 1994, in Hyogo in 2005 and in Sendai in 2015. As requested by the UN General Assembly, the United Nations Office for Disaster Risk Reduction (UNDRR) served as the coordinating body for the Second and Third UN World Conference on Disaster Reduction in 2005 and 2015.

The conferences bring together government officials and other stakeholders, such as NGOs, civil society organizations, local government and private sector representatives from around the world to discuss how to strengthen the sustainability of development by managing disaster and climate risks. The Third UN World conference adopted the Sendai Framework for Disaster Risk Reduction 2015–2030. Previous conference outcomes include the Hyogo Framework for Action 2005 – 2015: Building the Resilience of Nations and Communities to Disasters in 2005 and the Yokohama Strategy and Plan of Action for a Safer World in 1994.

== 1994 First World Conference on Natural Disasters in Yokohama ==
The First World Conference on Natural Disasters in Yokohama, Japan from May 23 to 27, 1994, adopted the Yokohama Strategy for a Safer World: Guidelines for Natural Disaster Prevention, Preparedness and Mitigation and its Plan of Action, endorsed by the UN General Assembly in 1994. It was the main outcome of the mid-term review of the International Decade of Natural Disaster Reduction (IDNDR) and established 10 principles for its strategy, a plan of action and a follow-up. Furthermore, it provides guidelines for natural disaster prevention, preparedness and mitigation.

=== Ten principles of the Yokohama Strategy for a Safer World ===
The ten principles of the Yokohama Strategy for a Safer World:

1. Risk assessment is a required step for the adoption of adequate and successful disaster reduction policies and measures.
2. Disaster prevention and preparedness are of primary importance in reducing the need for disaster relief.
3. Disaster prevention and preparedness should be considered integral aspects of development policy and planning at national, regional, bilateral, multilateral and international levels.
4. The development and strengthening of capacities to prevent, reduce and mitigate disasters is a top priority area to be addressed during the Decade so as to provide a strong basis for follow-up activities to the Decade.
5. Early warnings of impending disasters and their effective dissemination using telecommunications, including broadcast services, are key factors to successful disaster prevention and preparedness.
6. Preventive measures are most effective when they involve participation at all levels, from the local community through the national government to the regional and international level.
7. Vulnerability can be reduced by the application of proper design and patterns of development focused on target groups, by appropriate education and training of the whole community.
8. The international community accepts the need to share the necessary technology to prevent, reduce and mitigate disaster; this should be made freely available and in a timely manner as an integral part of technical cooperation.
9. Environmental protection as a component of sustainable development consistent with poverty alleviation is imperative in the prevention and mitigation of natural disasters.
10. Each country bears the primary responsibility for protecting its people, infrastructure, and other national assets from the impact of natural disasters. The international community should demonstrate strong political determination required to mobilize adequate and make efficient use of existing resources, including financial, scientific and technological means, in the field of natural disaster reduction, bearing in mind the needs of the developing countries, particularly the least developed countries.

== 2005 Second World Conference on Disaster Reduction in Kobe ==

The Second World Conference on Disaster Reduction conference was held in Kobe, Japan from 18 to 22 January 2005. This conference took on particular poignancy, as it came almost 10 years to the day after the Great Hanshin earthquake in Kobe and less than a month after the 2004 Indian Ocean tsunami. Japan's long history of severe natural disasters, prominence in international humanitarian aid and development and its scientific achievements in monitoring dangerous natural phenomena also made it a suitable conference venue.

The upcoming conference had not garnered much attention, but due to the 26 December, Indian Ocean tsunami, the attendance grew dramatically and the international media focused on the event. Japan's Emperor Akihito opened the conference and welcomed 4,000 participants from around the world.

The World Conference adopted plans to put in place an International Early Warning Programme (IEWP), which had first been proposed at the Second International Conference on Early Warning in 2003 in Bonn, Germany.

=== Conference objectives ===
The goal of the World Conference was to find ways to reduce the toll of disasters through preparation, and ultimately to reduce human casualties. Due to the proximity to the devastating Indian Ocean tsunami, developing a global tsunami warning system was high on the agenda. Other topics included:

- pledges to reduce disaster damage
- healthcare after disaster
- early warning systems
- safe building standards
- agree upon cost-effective preventative countermeasures
- a global database on relief and reconstruction and a centre on water hazards

The Pacific Rim Tsunami Warning system is an example of a cost-effective warning system; its yearly operating cost is approximately US$4 million. The yearly operating cost of a hypothetical global warning system is estimated at US$30 million. This cost, compared to the international aid donations of nearly US$8 billion for the 2004 Indian Ocean earthquake and tsunami, clearly demonstrates the cost effectiveness of such a system.

=== Hyogo Framework for Action ===
The Hyogo Framework for Action (2005–2015): Building the Resilience of Nations and Communities to Disasters was an outcome of the 2005 conference. The Hyogo Framework (HFA) was the first plan to explain, describe and detail the work required from all different sectors and actors to reduce disaster losses. It was developed and agreed on with the many partners needed to reduce disaster risk – governments, international agencies, disaster experts and many others – bringing them into a common system of coordination. The HFA, which ran from 2005 to 2015, set five specific priorities for action:

1. Making disaster risk reduction a priority;
2. Improving risk information and early warning;
3. Building a culture of safety and resilience;
4. Reducing the risks in key sectors;
5. Strengthening preparedness for response.

== 2015 Third UN World Conference on Disaster Risk Reduction (WCDRR) in Sendai ==

The Third UN United Nations World Conference on Disaster Risk Reduction was held in Sendai, Japan from 14 to 18 March 2015, drawing 6,500 delegates to the conference itself and 50,000 people to the associated Public Forum. Sendai is the largest city of Miyagi Prefecture, in north-eastern Japan. It has a prominent status as it was hit by the Great East Japan earthquake, 130 kilometres from the epicentre. The conference included discussion of the aftermath of the Japanese response to the 2011 disaster and how Japan's early warning system can save lives when earthquakes and tsunamis strike. The conference included an announcement of a US$4 billion fund to prepare for disasters over four years. Moreover, the conference coincided with Cyclone Pam hitting Vanuatu, and Vanuatu President Baldwin Lonsdale urgently requested international assistance for his people. Thus, in 2015, many developed nations announced they would partner with smaller countries to prepare for future disaster relief operations.

The conference adopted the Sendai Framework for Disaster Risk Reduction 2015–2030. The Sendai Framework is the first major agreement of the post-2015 development agenda, with seven targets and four priorities for action. It was endorsed by the UN General Assembly in June 2015.

=== Sendai Framework for Disaster Risk Reduction 2015–2030 ===
The Sendai Framework for Disaster Risk Reduction (2015–2030) is an international document adopted by the United Nations (UN) member states in March 2015 at the World Conference on Disaster Risk Reduction held in Sendai, Japan, and endorsed by the UN General Assembly in June 2015. It is the successor agreement to the Hyogo Framework for Action (2005–2015), which had been the most encompassing international accord to date on disaster risk reduction.

== See also ==
- Climate change
- Climate change adaptation
- Disaster risk reduction
- Emergency management
- Natural disaster
- Risk management
- United Nations International Strategy for Disaster Reduction
- Vulnerability
- Building Back Better
