= Disaster risk reduction =

Preventing and reducing disaster risk factors

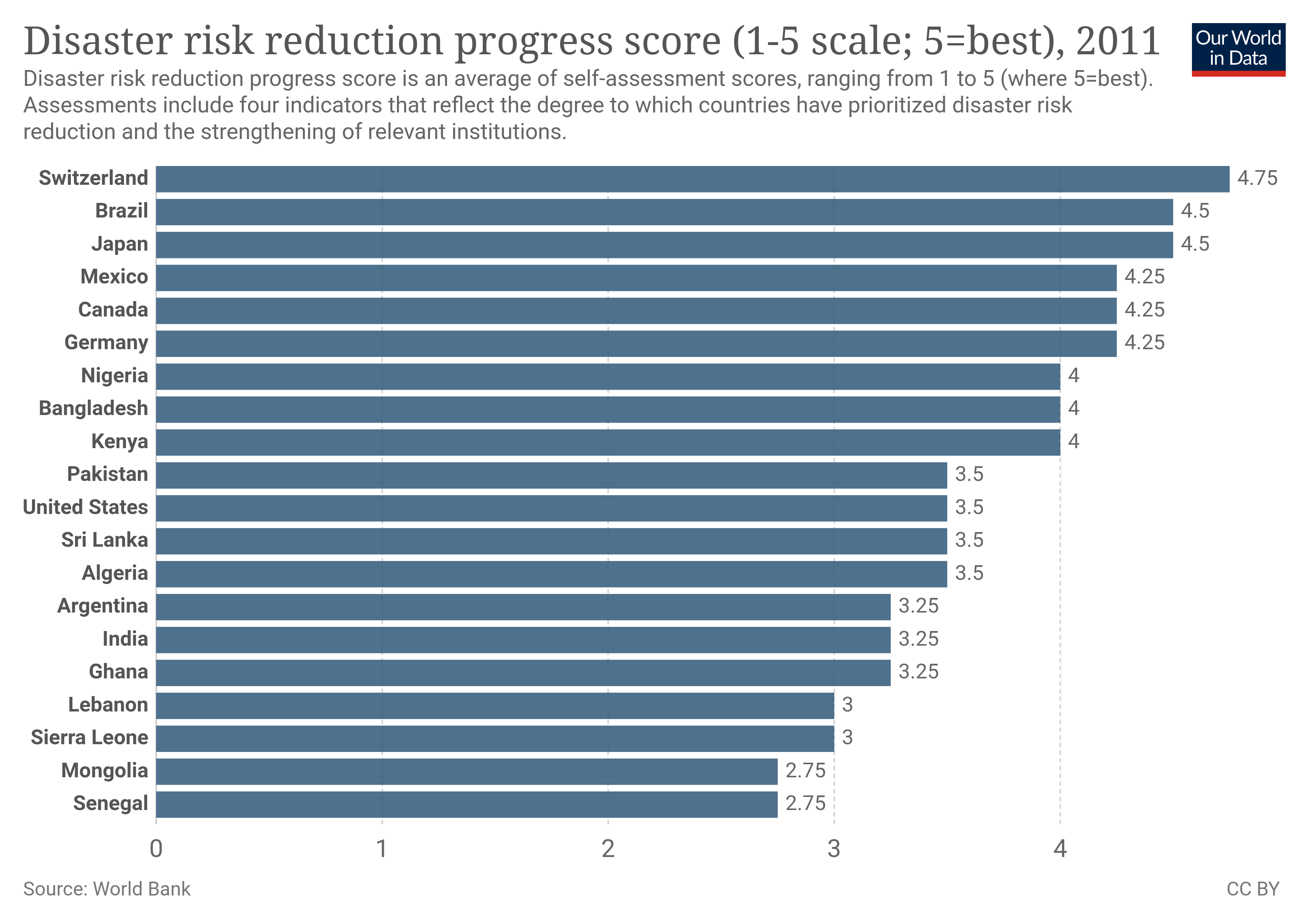
Disaster risk reduction progress score for some countries in 2011. The score of 5 is best. Assessments include four indicators that reflect the degree to which countries have prioritised disaster risk reduction and the strengthening of relevant institutions.

Disaster risk reduction aims to make disasters less likely to happen. The approach, also called DRR or disaster risk management, also aims to make disasters less damaging when they do occur. DRR aims to make communities stronger and better prepared to handle disasters. In technical terms, it aims to make them more resilient or less vulnerable. When DRR is successful, it makes communities less the vulnerable because it mitigates the effects of disasters. This means DRR can make risky events fewer and less severe. Climate change can increase climate hazards. So development efforts often consider DRR and climate change adaptation together.

It is possible to include DRR in almost all areas of development and humanitarian work. People from local communities, agencies or federal governments can all propose DRR strategies. DRR policies aim to "define goals and objectives across different timescales and with concrete targets, indicators and time frames."

There are some challenges for successful DRR. Local communities and organisations should be actively involved in the planning process. Age can also be a barrier, with the needs of children and young people often overlooked. The role and funding of local government also needs to be considered. Furthermore, DRR strategies should be mindful of gender. For example, studies have shown that women and girls are disproportionately impacted by disasters. A gender-sensitive approach would identify how disasters affect men, women, boys and girls differently. It would shape policy that addresses people's specific vulnerabilities and needs.

The Sendai Framework for Disaster Risk Reduction is an international initiative that has helped 123 countries adopt both federal and local DRR strategies (as of 2022). The International Day for Disaster Risk Reduction, on October 13 every year, has helped increase the visibility of DRR. It aims to promote a culture of prevention.

Spending on DRR is difficult to quantify for many countries. Global estimates of costs are therefore not available. However an indication of the costs for developing countries is given by the Us$215 billion to $387 billion per year (up to 2030) estimated costs for climate adaptation. DRR and climate adaptation share similar goals and strategies. They both require increased finance to address rising climate risks.

DRR activities are part of the national strategies and budget planning in most countries. However the priorities for DRR are often lower than for other development priorities. This has an impact on public sector budget allocations. For many countries, less than 1% of the national budget is available for DRR activities. The Global Facility for Disaster Reduction and Recovery (GFDRR) is a multi-donor partnership to support developing countries in managing the interconnected risks of natural hazards and climate hazards. Between 2007 and 2022, GFDRR provided $890 million in technical assistance, analytics, and capacity building support to more than 157 countries.

== Definitions and scope ==
Disaster risk reduction (DRR) is defined by United Nations Office for Disaster Risk Reduction (UNDRR) as those actions which aim to "prevent new and reducing existing disaster risk and managing residual risk, all of which contribute to strengthening resilience and therefore to the achievement of sustainable development".

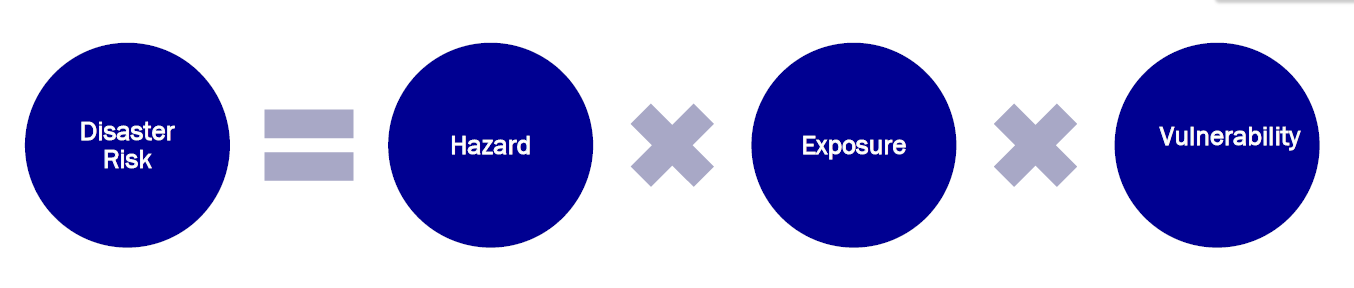
The risk equation shows that disaster risk is a product of hazard, exposure, and climate change vulnerability (where 'x' represents interaction between the components).

Disaster risk is the potential loss of life, injury, or destroyed or damaged assets that could impact a society or community. Disaster risk results from the interaction of three factors: hazard(s), vulnerability and exposure. This is illustrated in the risk equation.

Disaster risk reduction is extensive: Its scope is much broader and deeper than conventional emergency management. The objectives of DRR align with many sectors of development and humanitarian work.

DRR is such an all-embracing concept that it has proved difficult to define or explain in detail, although the broad idea is clear enough. It is generally understood to mean the broad development and application of policies, strategies, and practices to minimize vulnerabilities and disaster risks throughout society. Its policy goals and objectives are defined in disaster risk reduction strategies and plans.

The term disaster risk management (DRM) is often used in the same context and to mean much the same thing. That is a systematic approach to identifying, assessing, and reducing risks associated with hazards and human activities. DRM is more properly applied to the operational aspects of DRR: the practical implementation of DRR initiatives. In other words, disaster risk reduction is the policy objective of disaster risk management.

== Related concepts ==
=== Resilience ===
Resilience is scientifically defined as the efficiency with which a system can reduce the extent and duration of a disruption. The concept can take two forms: hard and soft resilience. Hard resilience refers to the strength of a structure to withstand pressure, while soft resilience is whether a system can recover from a disruptive event without changing its core function.

Alternatively, the United Nations International Strategy for Disaster Reduction (UNISDR) defines resilience as "the ability of a system, community or society exposed to hazards to resist, absorb, accommodate to and recover from the effects of a hazard in a timely and efficient manner, including through the preservation and restoration of its essential basic structures and functions."

Use of the term resilience in this context has evolved over time and across science, humanities, legal and political disciplines. Professor David Alexander points out that there are complications and contradictions to be aware of if using it as a model or paradigm in the context of disaster risk reduction.

=== Vulnerability ===
According to the UNISDR, vulnerabilities are "the characteristics and circumstances of a community, system or asset that make it susceptible to the damaging effects of a hazard." The most vulnerable people or communities are those who have the most difficulties accessing resources they need to respond to an event.

Vulnerability plays a critical role in the analysis of risk, as the risk a structure faces is proportional to its level of vulnerability. Risk is often defined by the likelihood of an event occurring and the vulnerability of the community to that event. The more vulnerable the community, the more risk they face.

=== Risk reduction and mitigation ===
Mitigation is often used interchangeably with risk reduction, however the terms have a few key differences. Both aim to reduce the number of negative effects of hazards, but risk reduction focuses on reducing the likelihood of the event itself, while mitigation focuses on reducing the impact of the event.

Natural risk assessments commonly use the term mitigation, while broader climate change reports tend to use adaptive capacity instead (mitigation holds another definition in the scope of climate change; see climate change mitigation). Although related, adaptive capacity refers more to the potential to adjust a system, while mitigation is the actual implementation of adjustments.

Mitigation planning helps local governments lessen the impacts of hazards within their communities. No two locations have the same hazard risks and communities know their experiences best. For example, even if a hazard is not recorded in government data, locals will take note of anything that occurs in their neighborhood. Policymakers can use community input to create more efficient mitigation plans.

=== Climate change adaptation ===
Climate change, through rising temperatures, changing rainfall patterns, and increasing sea levels, affects the nature of hydro meteorological hazards that can give rise to a disaster. Examples of such hazards are droughts, floods, and cyclones. Research on climate change adaptation has been ongoing since the 1990s.

Climate change contributes to disaster risk. Therefore, experts often see climate change adaptation as one of many processes within disaster risk reduction. In turn, disaster risk reduction is part of the broader consideration of sustainable development. Climate change adaptation and disaster risk reduction have similar goals (to reduce potential impacts of hazards and increase the resilience of people at risk). They use similar concepts and are informed by similar sources and studies.

Disasters are often triggered by natural hazards. A natural event such as a fire or flood is not of itself a disaster: it's only when it affects people or is caused by them that is counts as a disaster. It is argued that natural disasters are always linked to human action or inaction or rooted in anthropogenic processes. Disasters, economic loss, and the underlying vulnerabilities that drive risk are increasing. Global risks like climate change are having major impacts everywhere. Scientists forecast climate change will increase the frequency and severity of extreme weather events and disasters. Adaptation may include measures to increase preparedness and relevant disaster response capacities.

== International governance ==
=== Sendai Framework for Disaster Risk Reduction ===
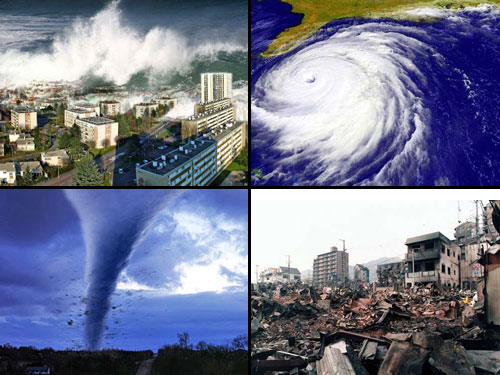
Different kinds of disasters

The Sendai Framework places the responsibility of reducing disaster risk primarily on federal governments through seven targets divided into two categories: substantial reductions and increases. It aims to reduce disaster mortality, people affected, economic loss, and damage to infrastructure and services. The remaining targets work to increase access to warning systems, aid to developing countries, and the number of countries with disaster risk reduction strategies. Since the adoption of the Sendai Framework in 2015, the number of countries with national DRR strategies has increased dramatically, from 55 to 123 countries in 2022.

The framework also details four priorities for action to be accomplished by 2030:

1. Understanding disaster risk
2. Strengthening disaster risk governance
3. Investing in disaster risk reduction
4. Enhancing disaster preparedness

These priorities acknowledge current shortcomings of DRR efforts, such as the lack of communication between local and federal governments and private programs, as well inequities faced by women and people with disabilities in the realm of disaster response.

==== Global Facility for Disaster Reduction and Recovery ====
The Global Facility for Disaster Reduction and Recovery (GFDRR) is a global partnership program established on September 29, 2006, to support developing countries on disaster risk reduction and climate change adaptation. The facility is administered by the World Bank and governed by a Consultative Group including the World Bank Group, the United Nations Office for Disaster Risk Reduction (UNDRR) and several other international organizations and countries.

GFDRR was initially launched to support the implementation of the Hyogo Framework for Action 2005-2015 (HFA) approved during the Second World Conference on Disaster Reduction in 2005. On March 18, 2015, the Sendai Framework for Disaster Risk Reduction 2015-2030 (Sendai Framework) was adopted. GFDRR now supports the implementation of this framework.

=== International Day for Disaster Risk Reduction ===
The United Nations General Assembly designated October 13 as the International Day for Disaster Risk Reduction (IDDRR) to encourage citizens and governments alike to foster more disaster-resilient communities. The day was created in 1989 as part of the United Nations' proclamation of the International Decade for Natural Disaster Reduction. Originally, the IDDRR was on the second Wednesday of October and intended to highlight the goals of the decade for disaster reduction. In 2009 the day was officially set as October 13, rather than the second Wednesday of the month.

The IDDRR supports the themes of the Sendai Framework, especially after the Midterm Review of the Sendai Framework for Disaster Risk Reduction 2015-2030. The 2023 IDDRR, just months after this report, intended to bolster the framework's new plan for accelerated disaster resistance by highlighting inequalities in disaster preparedness. The 2023 IDDRR used the tagline "Fighting Inequality for a Resilient Future" and hashtags #ResilienceForAll, #BreakTheCycle, and #DDRDay to spread awareness on social media.

=== Sustainable Development Goals ===
In 2015 the Sustainable Development Goals (SDGs) were adopted as part of the broad intergovernmental agreement on development to 2030. Many of these objectives tie directly into disaster risk reduction, and sustainable development plans often mention DRR.

DRR is applicable and relevant to several of the Sustainable Development Goals:

- SDG11 (sustainable cities and communities) lists DRR as a means of implementation. Targets 11.5 and 11.B call for more investment into disaster risk resilience strategies and policies, and 11.B aims to assess DRR strategies in accordance with the Sendai Framework.
- SDG13 (climate action) also uses DRR as a means of implementation. Target 13.1 aims to strengthen resilience to climate related hazards, and measures the number of local and federal governments who have adopted DRR strategies.
- Numerous other SDGs also rely on DRR strategies as an interdisciplinary method of achieving their goals. For example, SDG9 (industry, innovation, and infrastructure) aims to build infrastructure that is resilient to hazards, and SDG1 (to end poverty) asserts that many impoverished people have the highest vulnerability to disasters. DRR implementation has long lasting effects on a wide range of social issues due to these related factors.

== Issues and challenges ==
=== Communities and their organizations ===
Traditional emergency management thinking makes two misleading assumptions about communities. First, it sees other forms of social organisation (voluntary and community-based organisations, informal social groupings and families) as irrelevant to emergency action. Spontaneous actions by affected communities or groups (e.g., search and rescue) are viewed as irrelevant or disruptive, because they are not controlled by the authorities. The second assumption is that disasters produce passive 'victims' who are overwhelmed by crisis or dysfunctional behavior (panic, looting, self-seeking activities) and need to be controlled — in some cases, through the imposition of martial law.

An alternative viewpoint emphasises the importance of communities and local organisations in disaster risk management. In this strategy, local people and organisations are the main actors in risk reduction and disaster response. Community-based disaster risk management responds to local problems and needs, capitalises on local knowledge and expertise, is cost-effective, improves the likelihood of sustainability through genuine 'ownership' of projects, strengthens community technical and organisational capacities, and empowers people by enabling them to tackle these and other challenges. Understanding the social capital already existent in the community can greatly help reducing the risk at the community level.

Low community involvement can increase the severity of disaster. Community volunteers provide crucial resources to recovery efforts, such as access to communication, search and rescue efforts, supply distribution, housing and food provision, and technological assistance. Government agencies rarely "consider the needs and desires of communities" or ask for community input when implementing their DRR strategies. A case study in Rwanda showed that only 14.7% of policy utilised "community's traditional knowledge" when creating plans, despite expressed interest from the community.

=== Governance ===
In most countries, risk management is decentralised to local governments. In urban areas, the most widely used tool is the local development plan (municipal, comprehensive or general plan), followed by emergency and risk reduction plans that local governments are required to adopt by law and are updated every 4–5 years. In many contexts, especially South of the Sahara, this process clashes with the lack of funds or mechanisms for transferring resources from the central to the local budget.

=== Gender ===
Disaster risk is not gender-neutral. Studies have shown that women and girls are disproportionately impacted by disasters. Following the 2004 tsunami in the Indian Ocean, 77% and 72% of the deaths in the districts of North Aceh and Aceh Besar, Indonesia, were female. And in India 62% of people who died were female. This is due to socially-constructed gender roles that determine what norms and behaviors are acceptable for women and men, and girls and boys. In particular, women tend to take responsibility for home-based tasks and can be reluctant to leave their assets in the case of hazard warning; and often do not learn survival skills that can help in disasters, such as learning to swim or climb.

A gender-sensitive approach would identify how disasters affect men, women, boys and girls differently and shape policy that addresses people's specific vulnerabilities, concerns and needs.

== Cost and financing ==
=== Costs ===
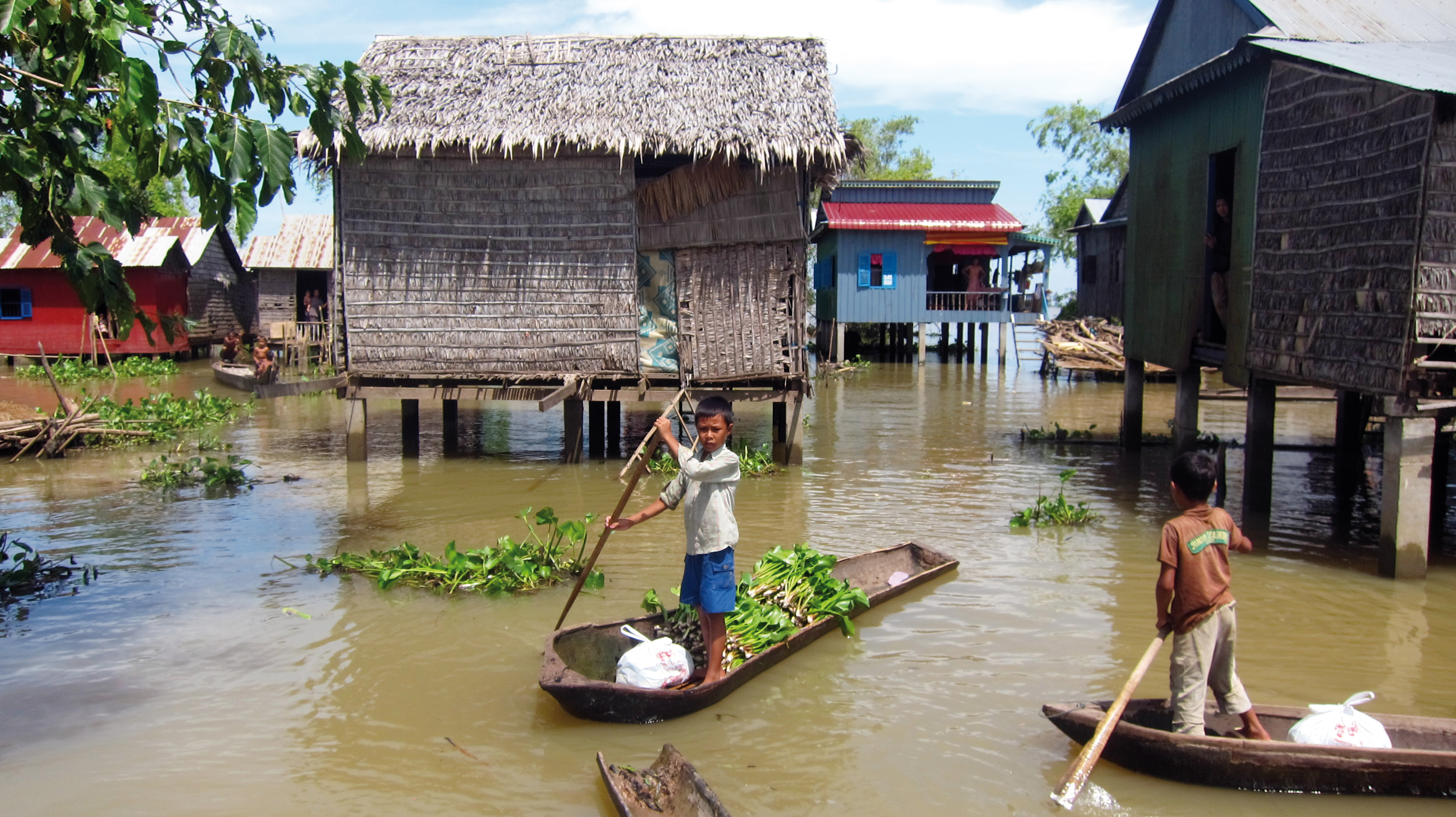
People have adapted the design of houses to protect them from rising flood waters. Small boats are used to transport people and food to sustain livelihoods. This kind of disaster risk reduction is also a method for climate change adaptation.

The economic costs of climate-related disasters are on the rise. Recent global costs have averaged above US$330 billion/year (over 2015-2021).The insurance sector estimated that weather- and climate-related disasters contributed to $165 billion of economic losses worldwide in 2018 and $210 billion in 2020. These figures are likely to be underestimates because of under-reporting and technical difficulties in estimating losses. Disaster risks are expected to significantly increase in future and may have cascading economic impacts, including on the financial system and repayment of national debts.

Spending on DRR has proved difficult to quantify for many countries. Global estimates of costs are therefore not available. However an indication of the costs for developing countries is given by the $215 - US$387 billion per year (up to 2030) estimated costs for climate adaptation. DRR and climate adaptation share similar goals and strategies and governing entities have similar mandates including advocating for increased finance to address climate risks.

DRR activities are part of the national strategies and budget planning in most countries. However the priorities for DRR are often lower than for other development priorities. This has an impact on public sector budget allocations. For many countries, less than 1% of the national budget is available for DRR activities. This can lead to an over-reliance on international development funding for some activities, which may not align fully with national priorities and needs. Other barriers include complex application processes and strict eligibility requirements that hamper access to international funding.

=== Financing needs and finance flows ===
Only around 90% of international funding for DRR is currently spent on responding to and recovering from disasters, rather than managing their future risks. Most of this funding is spent on the settlements, infrastructure and service development sectors. Moreover, only a very small percentage, around 0.5%, of total international development aid is currently spent on the pre-disaster phase of disaster risk reduction. This is despite the finding that every dollar spent on risk reduction saves between $5 and $10 in economic losses from disasters. A case study of Niger showed positive cost and benefit results for preparedness spending across 3 different scenarios (from the absolute level of disaster loss, to the potential reduction in disaster loss and the discount rate), estimating that every $1 spent results in $3.25 to $5.31 of benefit.

The Global Facility for Disaster Reduction and Recovery (GFDRR) is a multi-donor partnership supporting low and middle-income countries in managing paired risks of natural hazards and climate change. Between 2007 and 2022, GFDRR provided $890 million in technical assistance, analytics, and capacity building support to more than 157 countries. For example, GFDRR supported Maputo, Mozambique to develop detailed vulnerability maps to inform government funding decisions. In 2022, the GFDRR committed $21.1 million in new grants and $3.3 million in additional funds to scale up existing activities. GFDRR also works to mobilise additional funding through the World Bank and other development banks' engagement. It estimates that each dollar of GFDRR financing influences at least 100 dollars in climate resilient development impact.

Innovations in financing DRR include the establishment of risk disclosure initiatives to understand whether companies are managing their exposure to disaster risks. They include regulatory frameworks to incentivise private investments in risk reduction and resilience. There has also been innovation in new financing instruments such as resilience bonds and use of green bonds.

== History ==
Disaster risk reduction has been strongly influenced by mapping of natural disaster risks and research on vulnerability since the mid-1970s.

Disaster management thinking and practice since the 1970s has included more focus on understanding why disasters happen. It has also focused on actions that can reduce risk before a disaster occurs. This has put more emphasis on mitigation and preparedness in addition to the response and recovery phases of disasters. It has been widely embraced by governments, disaster planners and civil society organisations.

There have been growing calls for greater clarity about components of DRR and about indicators of progress toward resilience — a challenge that the international community took up at the UN's World Conference on Disaster Reduction (WCDR) in Kobe, Japan, in 2005, only days after the 2004 Indian Ocean earthquake. The WCDR began the process of pushing international agencies and national governments beyond the vague rhetoric of most policy statements and toward setting clear targets and commitments for DRR.

The first step of the WCDR's process was formally approving the Hyogo Framework for Action (2005–2015) (HFA). The HFA was the first internationally accepted framework for DRR. It set out an ordered sequence of objectives (outcome – strategic goals – priorities), with five priorities for action attempting to 'capture' the main areas of DRR intervention. The UN's biennial Global Platform for Disaster Risk Reduction provided an opportunity for the UN and its member states to review progress against the Hyogo Framework. It held its first session 5–7 June 2007 in Geneva, Switzerland, where UNISDR is based. The subsequent Global Platforms were held in June 2009, May 2011 and May 2013, all in Geneva.

Subtitled "Building the Resilience of Nations and Communities to Disasters," the HFA emphasises how resilience to hazards is needed for community development and planning.

=== International Decade for Natural Disaster Reduction (1990s) ===
The United Nations General Assembly designated the 1990s an International decade for natural disaster reduction. The United Nations' Secretary-General had been tasked with overseeing research into the relationship between disasters and development, and in 1987 reported that there was room for improvement from the international community. Due to the increasing numbers of international deaths and damages due to climate related hazards, especially in developing countries, the United Nations believed dedicating a decade to the topic would substantially improve policies at local, regional, and federal levels.

The 1987 General Assembly session proposed 5 goals to guide policy efforts:

1. Improve the capacity to mitigate effects of natural disasters, especially in developing countries
2. Devise plans to apply preexisting knowledge of disasters from diverse perspectives
3. Foster programs aimed to close knowledge gaps
4. Disseminate information about current measures being applied
5. Develop programs to prevent and mitigate disasters specific to each hazard and location

Before the start of the decade in 1989, The General Assembly discussed plans for the decade in more detail and created the International Framework of Action for the International Decade for Natural Disaster Reduction. This framework restates the goals, and adds further guidelines for national governments, the United Nations Systems, and the Secretary-General to follow.

Federal governments were encouraged to participate in the decade, formulate national mitigation programs, create scientific committees, encourage local action, inform the Secretary-General of their actions, increase public awareness, monitor the impact of disasters on health care, and improve availability of emergency supplies. The proposed role of the United Nations System focused on holding countries accountable for these goals, as well as providing resources or policy plans countries may need for implementation. However, many of the tasks given to the United Nations fall to the secretary-general.

During the 1990s, there were three secretaries-general: Javier Pérez de Cuéllar, Boutros Boutros-Ghalil, and Kofi Annan. Over the decade, these secretaries were tasked with establishing and leading a number of committees for the decade, including a scientific and technical committee on the International Decade for Natural Disaster Reduction, a special high-level council to provide general advice and promote awareness, and a secretariat that would handle daily activities and support the other committees. These groups, as well as leaders of each country, would report their progress to the secretary-general, who would oversee all progress and report to the General Assembly every two years on the progress of the decade's goals.

== Examples ==
=== Bangladesh ===
Based on the Climate Risk Index, Bangladesh is one of the most disaster-prone countries in the world. Bangladesh is highly vulnerable to different types of disasters because of climatic variability, extreme events, high population density, high incidence of poverty and social inequity, poor institutional capacity, inadequate financial resources, and poor infrastructure. Bangladesh commenced its disaster preparedness following the cyclone of 1991 and has now a comprehensive National Plan for Disaster Management which provides mechanisms at both national and sub-national levels.

=== Cuba ===
Located in the Caribbean, Cuba is highly vulnerable to tropical storms and hurricanes, yet it is frequently recognized for its low mortality rates during such weather events. Cuban disaster risk reduction became an integral part of the socialist project in the aftermath of the catastrophic Hurricane Flora in 1963. The extensive damage and loss of life led the Cuban government to institutionalize disaster preparedness as a central part of state governance. The event catalyzed the development of Cuba's Civil Defense system, integrating community-based preparedness and centralized response mechanisms. Unlike neoliberal approaches that rely on market-based solutions, Cuba's DRR model is rooted in state-led infrastructure, with centralized decision-making and mass mobilization of citizens.

=== European Union ===
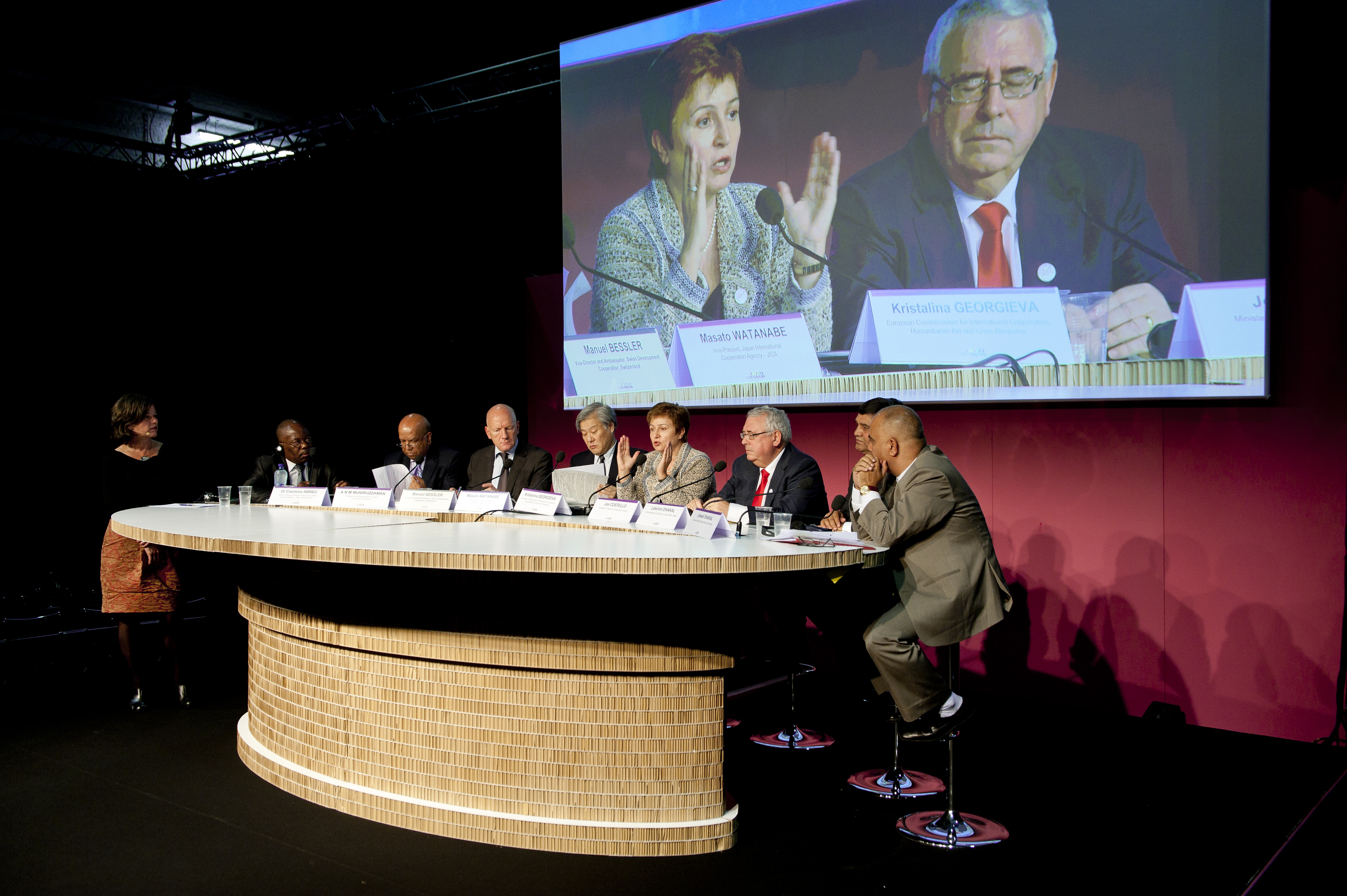
Panel on Disaster Risk Reduction in the age of Climate Change during a 2012 European Union Development Day

In addition to providing funding to humanitarian aid, the European Commission's Directorate-General for European Civil Protection and Humanitarian Aid Operations (DG-ECHO) is in charge of the EU Civil Protection Mechanism to coordinate the response to disasters in Europe and beyond and contributes to at least 75% of the transport and/or operational costs of deployments. Established in 2001, the Mechanism fosters cooperation among national civil protection authorities across Europe. Currently 34 countries are members of the Mechanism; all 27 EU Member States in addition to Iceland, Norway, Serbia, North Macedonia, Montenegro, Turkey and Bosnia and Herzegovina. The Mechanism was set up to enable coordinated assistance from the participating states to victims of natural and man-made disasters in Europe and elsewhere.

=== United States ===
The United States has a government organization designated to address emergency management. The Federal Emergency Management Agency (FEMA) created a model to measure hazardous events. This assessment plan, the FEMA model, uses history, vulnerability, maximum threat, and probability of each potential disaster to predict potential damage. Each hazard is then given a rating on the scale using these criteria and comparisons to other hazards to determine the priority of mitigation efforts.

As of May 2023, FEMA has updated their Local Mitigation Planning Handbook, which provides a framework for local governments to follow in the case of hazardous events. This strategy contains 4 steps: organise resources, assess risks, develop mitigation strategies, and implement plans. These steps are broad, as they are designed to be applied to a wide variety of hazards. FEMA also has more specific policy plans, such as their Hazard Mitigation Field Book (HMFB) on Roadways. This document focuses on preventing road erosion, inundation, and debris pileup caused by damaged culverts, embankments, and road surfaces. The HMFB uses a project identification diagram to realise each issue and a selection matrix to match that problem with an effective solution using duration, feasibility, design, and environmental considerations.

FEMA's Mitigation Directorate is responsible for programs that take action before any disaster occurs, in order to identify risks and reduce injuries, loss of property, and recovery time. The agency has major analysis programs for floods, hurricanes and tropical storms, dams, and earthquakes.

FEMA works to ensure affordable flood insurance is available to homeowners in flood plains, through the National Flood Insurance Program, and also works to enforce no-build zones in known flood plains and relocate or elevate some at-risk structures.

== See also ==
- Disaster response
- Emergency management
- Global catastrophic risk
- International Day for Disaster Reduction
- Hazard map
- Anticipatory action
