= Sendai Framework for Disaster Risk Reduction =

International accord adopted by the United Nations

The Sendai Framework for Disaster Risk Reduction (2015–2030) is an international document adopted by the United Nations (UN) member states in March 2015 at the World Conference on Disaster Risk Reduction held in Sendai, Japan, and endorsed by the UN General Assembly in June 2015. It is the successor agreement to the Hyogo Framework for Action (2005–2015), which had been the most encompassing international accord to date on disaster risk reduction.

== Priority areas ==
The Sendai Framework sets four specific priorities for action:

1. Understanding disaster risk;
2. Strengthening disaster risk governance to manage disaster risk;
3. Investing in disaster risk reduction for resilience;
4. Enhancing disaster preparedness for effective response, and to "Build Back Better" in recovery, rehabilitation and reconstruction.

== Global targets ==
To support the assessment of global progress in achieving the outcome and goal of the Sendai Framework, seven global targets have been agreed:

1. Substantially reduce global disaster mortality by 2030, aiming to lower average per 100,000 global mortality between 2020 and 2030 compared to 2005–2015;
2. Substantially reduce the number of affected people globally by 2030, aiming to lower the average global figure per 100,000 between 2020 and 2030 compared to 2005–2015;
3. Reduce direct disaster economic loss in relation to global gross domestic product by 2030;
4. Substantially reduce disaster damage to critical infrastructure and disruption of basic services, among them health and educational facilities, including through developing their resilience by 2030;
5. Substantially increase the number of countries with national and local disaster risk reduction strategies by 2020;
6. Substantially enhance international cooperation to developing countries through adequate and sustainable support to complement their national actions for implementation of the framework by 2030;
7. Substantially increase the availability of and access to multi-hazard early warning systems and disaster risk information and assessments to the people by 2030.

== Links with global goals ==
Member states emphasized the need to tackle disaster risk reduction and climate change adaptation when setting the 17 Sustainable Development Goals in 2015 (to be achieved by 2030), particularly in light of an insufficient focus on risk reduction and resilience in the original Millennium Development Goals. For example, Indicator 13.1.2 of Sustainable Development Goal 13 on climate action tracks the "number of countries that adopt and implement national disaster risk reduction strategies in line with the Sendai Framework for Disaster Risk Reduction 2015–2030".

== Development ==
The Sendai document emerged from three years of talks, assisted by the United Nations International Strategy for Disaster Reduction, during which UN member states, NGOs, and other stakeholders made calls for an improved version of the existing Hyogo Framework, with a set of common standards, a comprehensive framework with achievable targets, and a legally-based instrument for disaster risk reduction.

== See also ==
- Emergency management – Dealing with all humanitarian aspects of emergencies
- Natural disaster – Type of adverse event
- Risk management – Identification, evaluation and control of risks
- United Nations Office for Disaster Risk Reduction – United Nations organization
- World Conference on Disaster Risk Reduction – Series of United Nations conferences
