= Anticipatory action =

Disaster risk management approach

Anticipatory action is a form of humanitarian assistance that aims to save lives before a natural hazard (or other type of hazard) occurs or its impacts fully unfold. It is part of the disaster risk management cycle, bridging a critical gap between disaster preparedness and disaster response.

While anticipatory action takes different forms, there are common parameters to this approach:

- The preventive measures (the actions) are taken before a hazard occurs, or before its worst effects take place.
- The objective is to reduce the humanitarian impacts of forecastable hazards.
- The actions are taken based on forecasts or analysis of when and where a hazard will happen.

In 2025 anticipatory actions were implemented in 54 countries and for 17 types of hazards, with many more countries developing frameworks for different hazards. These actions reached over 9.6 million people and were supported by financing worth US$120m.

== Overview ==
Different countries and organizations take different approaches to anticipatory action. However, experience to date indicates that it works best when several core elements are agreed in advance, namely:

- the threshold, or 'trigger', used to activate the actions; for many hazards, this will be a forecast or other form of monitoring data (e.g., rising river levels to indicate a likelihood of floods)
- the actions that will be taken ahead of the hazard to reduce the risks to people in areas forecast to be affected
- the amount and source of financing for the actions; if agreed in advance, this can be released rapidly, allowing the actions to be carried out before a hazard's impacts are felt.

By acting ahead of a hazard, based on a forecast, it is possible to reduce the humanitarian needs caused by the hazard, leading to a reduced overall impact. However, establishing these elements ahead of a hazard requires funding, time, resources and collaboration across sectors and between partners. Ideally, the process of setting up an anticipatory action system or framework should include stakeholders from the humanitarian and development sectors. For weather- and climate-related hazards, involvement by hydrometeorological services and/or the climate sector is also necessary.

=== Financing ===
Theoretically, any financing for disaster management could be pre-arranged to support anticipatory action. To date, however, the majority of 'activations' – when a trigger threshold is reached, the framework is activated and the pre-agreed anticipatory actions are implemented – have been financed from three sources: the UN's Central Emergency Response Fund, the IFRC's Disaster Response Emergency Fund, and Start Network's Start Fund.

As more organizations include anticipatory action in their work, more diverse funding sources will be needed; the funding available for anticipatory action frameworks increased in 2023, but still comprised just 0.7% of total international humanitarian assistance in 2024.

=== Benefits ===
Benefits of anticipatory action include the fact that it helps to preserve people's dignity, provides value for money, and protects wider development gains. It can also contribute to the broader sustainability of the humanitarian system by reducing humanitarian needs after a hazard and thereby saving costs.

There are also sector-specific benefits. For example, an impact evaluation by the World Food Programme, of anticipatory actions ahead of floods in Nepal in 2022, indicated an overall net gain in food security for people targeted by the actions, as well as positive impacts on the coping strategies they used and their psychological wellbeing.

== Criticisms ==
Despite its positive impacts, there have been notable criticisms of anticipatory action:

- It is sometimes considered to be too technical, due to its dependence on forecasts or other scientific information; there are concerns about whether it is feasible to implement this approach in certain countries and contexts, where such data may not be consistently available.
- The limited financing available means that, in many countries, not everyone at risk from a hazard is covered by the frameworks or systems in place.

These and other criticisms have been aired during events focused on this approach, such as the annual dialogue platforms on anticipatory action.

== History of anticipatory action ==
Communities have been preparing for weather-related hazards, including through the use of forecasts (whether scientific or traditional), for centuries. However, the use of forecasts to trigger financing for humanitarian actions began in 2013, when the concept of forecast-based financing was conceptualized by humanitarian actors. In 2015, the German Federal Foreign Office financed pilot projects in Togo and Uganda to test this principle, with the focusing being acting ahead of floods. The World Food Programme also launched its initial projects that year, in Bangladesh, Dominican Republic, Haiti, Nepal and the Philippines.

Since then, a number of humanitarian organizations and non-governmental organizations have begun to implement this approach (which quickly became known as 'anticipatory action'), in more countries and for an increasing number of weather- and climate-related hazards. In 2024, at least 295 organizations and government ministries were involved in anticipatory action.

Since 2020, there have been targeted efforts among humanitarian actors to involve governments in anticipatory action. This has led to increasing efforts to formalize anticipatory action as a disaster management approach. In 2024, the 'State of Imminent Disaster' was formally introduced in the Philippines, which allows the application of preventive actions before the striking of natural disasters, based on risk assessments by agencies such as the National Disaster Risk Reduction and Management Council.

Another development in recent years has been projects that implement anticipatory actions ahead of non-weather events, such as disease outbreaks and epidemics, while research is under way to explore the feasibility of this approach to mitigate the impacts of livestock diseases, locust swarms and population movement/displacement.
