= Global Humanitarian Forum =

Former Swiss foundation

- Founded: 2007 by Kofi Annan, the Swiss government and the Canton of Geneva, Kofi Annan, President; Ivan Pictet, Vice-President; Walter Fust, CEO/Director-General
- Dissolved: 2010
- Type: Non-profit; NGO
- Location: Geneva, Switzerland
- Fields: humanitarian challenges, focus: human impact of climate change
- Staff: Kofi Annan, President; Ivan Pictet, Vice-President; Walter Fust, CEO/Director-General; Meinrad Studer, Director
- Website: http://www.ghf-ge.org

The Global Humanitarian Forum was a non-profit foundation in Geneva, Switzerland, active from 2007 to 2010. Presided over by former United Nations Secretary General Kofi Annan, its secretariat was established by Meinrad Studer, assigned by the SDC. Subsequently, the forum was led by CEO and Director General Walter Fust. The Forum intended to serve as an independent platform for debate and collaboration on global humanitarian issues. Its activities included research projects, advocacy and projects to deal with humanitarian concerns.

The organisation encountered serious financial difficulties due to which the Forum had to dismiss its staff in March 2010. On 31 March 2010 the Swiss Federal Department of Foreign Affairs announced that the Forum was over-indebted and obliged to cease its activity.

== Projects ==
The Forum's centerpiece event, the Annual Forum, was held each summer in Geneva. It gathered some 400 senior international participants from public, private and non-governmental sectors.

Other Forum projects included:

- The ‘tck tck tck’ campaign was created by the Global Humanitarian Forum and strategic communications partner Havas Worldwide/Euro RSCG. 'tck tck tck' was subsequently adopted as the unifying symbol for many civil society organizations worldwide, including a coalition of leading NGOs who campaigned for a fair and ambitious global agreement on climate change to be reached at the 2009 Copenhagen Climate Conference (COP15). The Forum and Havas launched their own 'tck tck tck Time for Climate Justice’ campaign in June 2009 at the 56th Cannes International Advertising Festival. The 'tck tck tck' symbol communicates a sense of urgency as time ticked down to the start of COP15 as well as the level of urgency for taking serious action to tackle climate change itself. All 'tck tck tck' material is open source and its creative use is encouraged.
- The Weather Info for All Initiative was a public-private partnership that supported adaptation to climate change worldwide by reinforcing the capacities of National Meteorological Services. The Initiative harnesses the growth of telecommunications services to install automatic weather stations (which report on humidity, temperature and other basic measures) at mobile network sites across the African continent. These locations are ideal as they provide connectivity, power and security. The automatic weather stations help fill the existing ground level weather observation gap and the delivery of accurate weather forecasts and early warnings via mobile short message service (SMS), thus aiming to help those worst affected by, and most vulnerable to the effects of climate change. Strategic partners include The Earth Institute at Columbia University, Ericsson, the World Meteorological Organization, Zain and Fairmount Weather Systems, Ltd.
- The Youth Forum was a platform for young people to come together and help solve humanitarian problems.
- The Human Impact Report was a major research project launched in May 2009. The resulting report has been widely criticised upon its publication. The first flagship research publication of the Forum, it was intended to be the first report comprehensively documenting the adverse impacts of climate change on human society. It was reviewed by a panel including climate change experts such as Saleemul Huq and Hans Schellnhuber, and development and disaster management experts such as Nitin Desai, Jeffrey Sachs and Margareta Wahlström. The report notably includes global estimates of loss of life, economic losses and other impacts linked to climate change, including that over 300,000 people die each year due to climate change – numbers which were subject to debate.
- Energy for the Poor was a project for launching a global study into the energy needs of the 1.6 billion people worldwide who lack access to any modern forms of energy whatsoever, together with The Energy Resources Institute, India (TERI).
- Drylands: Climate Change and Development was a regional initiative to boost adaptation measures in one of the most climate-stressed regions of the planet, together with the Earth Institute at Columbia University New York.

== The Foundation Board ==
The Foundation Board was the supreme governing body of the Forum, composed of senior members from the academic, business, government, international, and civil society fields. Members included:

- Kofi Annan, President
- Ivan Pictet, Vice-president
- Catherine Bertini
- Lakhdar Brahimi
- Michel Camdessus
- Mary Chinery-Hesse
- Jan Egeland
- Jacques Forster
- Goh Kee Nguan
- Rita Hauser
- Princess Haya bint Al Hussein
- Dean Hirsch
- Alois Hirschmugl
- Hans Küng
- Ricardo Lagos
- Dante Martinelli
- Rajendra Pachauri
- Mary Robinson
- Judith Rodin
- Jean-Louis Schiltz
- Amartya Sen
- Barbara Stocking
- Marianna Vardinoyannis
- James Wolfensohn
- Muhammad Yunus
