= Robert Glasser =

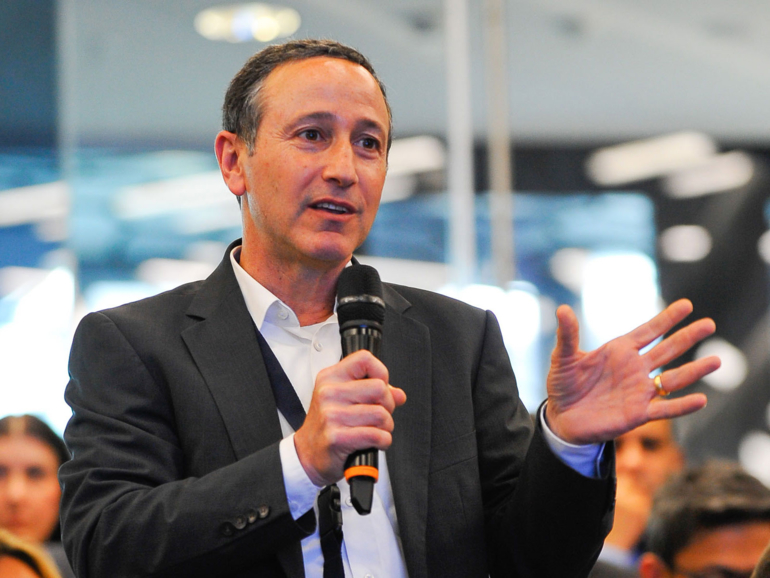
Robert Glasser, former special representative of the secretary-general for disaster risk reduction, took up his United Nations post in January 2016

Robert Glasser is the former special representative of the secretary-general for disaster risk reduction, and head of the United Nations International Strategy for Disaster Reduction (UNISDR). Australian national Glasser was nominated in November 2015 by Secretary-General of the United Nations Ban Ki-moon to succeed Margareta Wahlström of Sweden, who was the first such special representative and had been appointed in November 2008. Glasser took up his post in January 2016. He was succeeded on 1 March 2018 by Mami Mizutori.

The functions of the special representative include leading and overseeing UNISDR in the executions of its functions entrusted by the United Nations General Assembly, United Nations Economic and Social Council and the Hyogo Framework for Action and its successor the Sendai Framework for Disaster Risk Reduction, as well as policy directions by the secretary-general, overseeing the management of the Trust Fund for the International Strategy for Disaster Reduction, and carrying out high-level advocacy and resource mobilization activities for risk reduction and implementation. The special representative is also responsible for ensuring the strategic and operational coherence between disaster-reduction and humanitarian disaster preparedness and response activities, as well as socio-economic activities of the UN system and regional organizations.

Prior to joining the United Nations, Glasser had from 2008 served as Secretary General of CARE (relief agency), one of the world’s largest non-governmental humanitarian organizations, active in over 80 countries. From 2003 to 2007, he was the chief executive of CARE Australia, overseeing aid and humanitarian relief programmes in Cambodia, Viet Nam, Papua New Guinea and the Middle East. Before joining CARE, he was assistant director general at the Australian Agency for International Development.

Glasser has also been a member of the board of the Global Call for Climate Action, and was the inaugural board chairman of the CHS International Alliance, a new organization resulting from the June 2015 merger of People In Aid and Humanitarian Accountability Partnership International. He has also served as a fellow of the Geneva Centre for Security Policy.

Born in 1959, Glasser holds a PhD in international relations (strategic studies) from the Australian National University. He is married with three children.
