= Barak Kushner =

American historian of Japan

Barak Kushner (born 7 April 1968) is an American historian of Japan. He is a Professor of East Asian History at the University of Cambridge and Fellow at Corpus Christi College, Cambridge. He has written and edited numerous books and articles and has spoken on a range of East Asian history topics including Japanese imperial propaganda, the Japanese empire in East Asia, Japanese war crimes, and justice in East Asia. He has also written on other subjects, ranging from Godzilla and Japanese humor to ramen and the Chinese influence on early twentieth century notions of modern cuisine in Japan. Kushner is married to Mami Mizutori Assistant Secretary-General and Special Representative of the Secretary-General for Disaster Risk Reduction, United Nations Office for Disaster Risk Reduction (UNISDR). He speaks and reads Chinese, English, French, Japanese. In 2019–2020, Kushner was a Fellow at the Swedish Collegium for Advanced Study in Uppsala, Sweden.

== Education ==
BA, Brandeis University, 1990 PhD, Princeton University, 2002

== Monographs ==
- "Men to Devils, Devils to Men: Japanese War Crimes and Chinese Justice" (Harvard University Press, 2015), 416 pages. (Winner of the American Historical Association's 2016 John K. Fairbank Prize)
- "Slurp! A Culinary and Social History of Ramen, Japan’s Favorite Noodle Soup" (Leiden: Brill, 2012), (290 pages). (Winner of the 2013 Sophie Coe Prize for Food History) Traditional Chinese translation, 顧若鵬(譯者陳正杰)『拉麵的驚奇之旅』(台北:允晨文化出版 社, 2017), 264 pages.
- "The Thought War - Japanese Imperial Propaganda" (Honolulu: University of Hawaii Press, 2006), 242 pages. Japanese translation: バラク・クシュナー(井形彬訳)『思想戦:大日本帝国の プロパガンダ』(東京:明石書店, 2016), 420 pages.

== Edited volumes ==
- "The Dismantling of Japan's Empire in East Asia: De-imperialization, Postwar Legitimation and Imperial Afterlife" (London: Routledge, 2017), 334 pages, with Sherzod Muminov.
- "Examining Japan’s Lost Decades" (London: Routledge, 2015), 338 pages, with Funabashi Yoichi. Japanese translation:『検証 日本の「失われた20年」: 日本はなぜ停滞から抜け出せなかった のか』(東洋経済新報社, 2015), 488 pages.

== Translated Books ==
The Asahi Shimbun Company, Media, Propaganda and Politics in 20th-Century Japan (London: Bloomsbury Publishers, 2015, translated and edited by Barak Kushner with a foreword by Funabashi Yoichi), 320 pages.

== Awards and honors ==
- John K. Fairbank Prize for best book in East Asian History
- Cambridge DAAD German Research Hub Award
- Sophie Coe Prize for Food History
