= WIFA =

WIFA may refer to:

- Weather Info for All Initiative, a meteorological organization.
- West Indies Football Association, a football association representing the West Indies
- West Indies Federal Archives Centre, the official depository of records from the defunct West Indies Federation.
- Western India Football Association, the state governing body for football in Maharashtra, India.
- WIFA (AM), a radio station in Knoxville, Tennessee.
- Windward Islands Football Association, organizers of the Windward Islands Tournament.
- WIFA, online football manager, since November 15, 1998.
