= Mami Mizutori =

Japanese diplomat

- 水鳥 真美
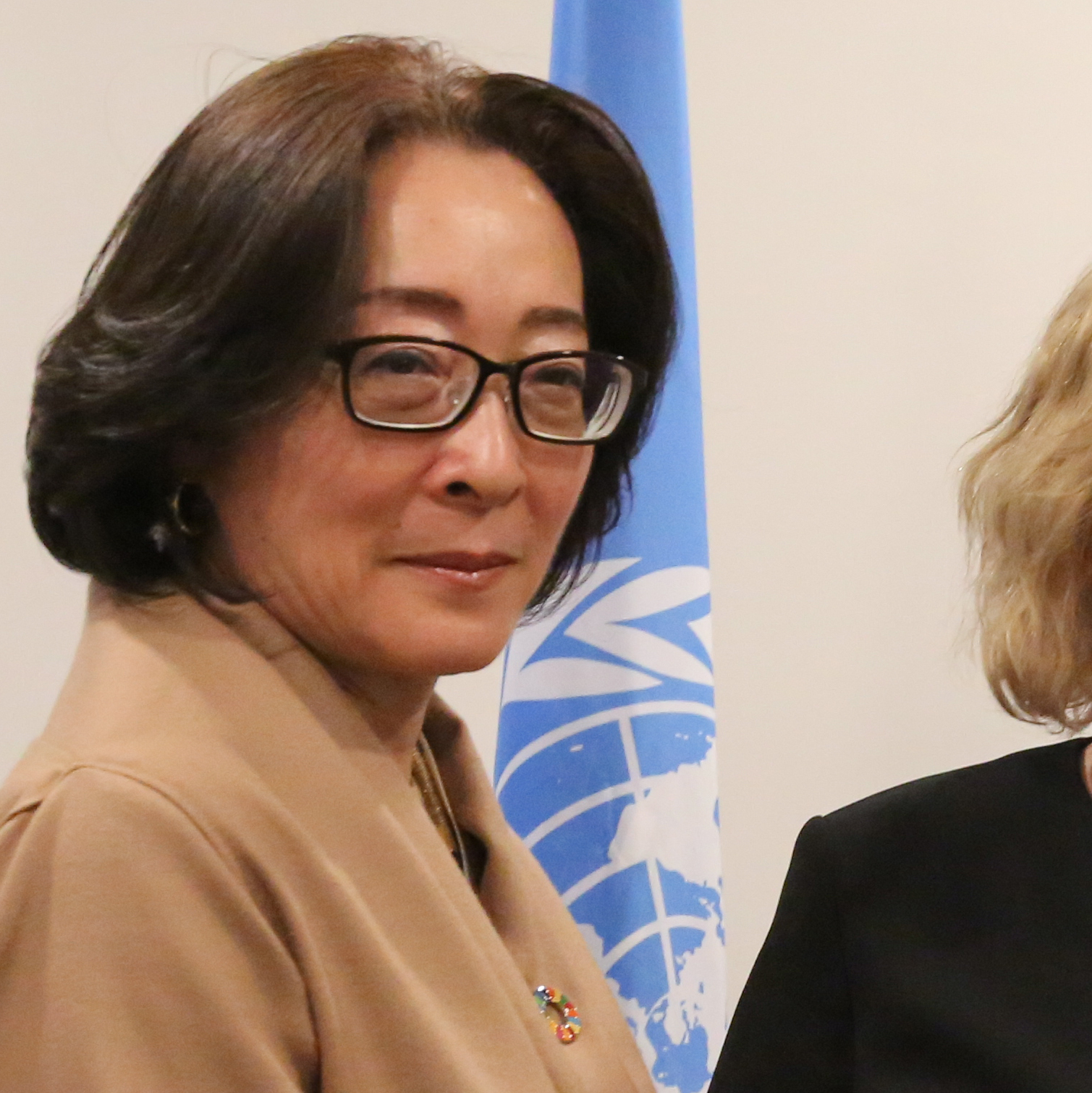
- Mizutori in 2018
- Born: November 15, 1960 (age 65); Tokyo, Japan
- Occupation: Diplomat
- Known for: United Nations Office for Disaster Risk Reduction

Mami Mizutori (水鳥 真美, Mizutori Mami; born 15 November 1960) is a Japanese diplomat. She has been the Assistant Secretary-General and Special Representative of the Secretary-General for Disaster Risk Reduction in the United Nations Office for Disaster Risk Reduction (UNDRR, formerly UNISDR) since March 2018.

== Early life and education ==
Mizutori earned a degree in law from Hitotsubashi University and a diploma in International Studies from the Diplomatic School of Spain.

== Career ==
After graduation, Mizutori joined the Japanese Ministry of Foreign Affairs, where she worked for twenty-seven years, serving among other positions as Budget Director, Director of the United Nations Policy Division, the National Security Policy Division, and the Status of US Forces Agreement Division and Director of the Japan Information and Culture Centre at the Japanese Embassy in London. In 2011, Mizutori became Executive Director of the Sainsbury Institute for the Study of Japanese Arts and Cultures at the University of East Anglia, in England. She has also taught courses at Ritsumeikan Asia Pacific University and Waseda University, has been published and advised think tanks on current affairs, and is a member of the UK-Japan 21st Century Group, which makes annual recommendations to the Prime Ministers of the two countries.

On 1 March 2018 Mizutori succeeded Robert Glasser as Special Representative of the United Nations Secretary-General for Disaster Risk Reduction and head of the United Nations Office for Disaster Risk Reduction (UNDRR, formerly UNISDR).

== Personal life ==
Mizutori is married to Barak Kushner, Professor of East Asian history at the University of Cambridge.
