= ANSP =

ANSP is an acronym for:

- Academic Network at São Paulo
- Academy of Natural Sciences of Philadelphia
- Afghan National Solidarity Programme
- Agency for National Security Planning, a preceding agency of the National Intelligence Service (South Korea)
- Air Navigation Service Provider
- American National Socialist Party
- Aviation, Navigation, and Satellite Programs, Inc.
