= Integrated Flood Management =

Type of flood management

Integrated Flood Management (IFM) (also Integrated Flood Risk Management) is an approach to managing floods that emphasizes collaboration among various stakeholders, disciplines, and sectors concerned with floods, i.e. integrating them. IFM is a component of Integrated Water Resources Management (IWRM) and was developed as more holistic approach compared to the concept of flood control. While flood control aims mainly on reducing or preventing the negative effects of floods, IFM aims on reducing the overall risk by means of land and water resources management with the goal of maximizing the benefits from the use of flood plains and minimizing the damage and loss of life due to flooding in a sustainable manner.

The concept of Integrated Flood Management has been developed by the Associated Programme on Flood Management (APFM). Initiated in 2001 by the World Meteorological Organization (WMO) and the Global Water Partnership (GWP), APFM aims to promote the concept of Integrated Flood Management globally.

== Key principles ==
Sources:

1. Collaboration: IFM encourages collaboration among government agencies, local communities, non-governmental organizations (NGOs), academia, and other stakeholders. The coordination of efforts across different sectors is essential for developing effective flood management strategies. It builds on a whole-of-society approach which a focus on the most vulnerable to floods like refugees, poor, women, disabled, minorities and others.
2. Sustainability: IFM aims to balance environmental, social, and economic considerations. Sustainable flood management practices seek to minimize the negative impact of flood events on the environment and communities while promoting long-term resilience.
3. Adaptive Management: IFM recognizes the dynamic nature of flood risk and the need for adaptive strategies. Flexibility and the ability to adjust management approaches based on changing conditions are crucial for effective flood management.

== Components ==
1. Risk Assessment and Mapping: Risk assessments and floodplain mapping help to identify vulnerable areas, evaluate potential impacts, and guide the development of targeted risk mitigation measures.
2. Land Use Planning: land use planning which considers different hydrological characteristics of land cover can reduce vulnerability to flooding. Zoning, urban planning, and the preservation of natural floodplains contribute to lowering flood risk.
3. Infrastructure Development: Structural measures as traditionally used by flood control, such as dams, levees, and flood barriers, play an important role in IFM as well by reducing the physical impact of floods. For IFM, these measures are implemented often through Nature-based solutions, considering also ecological considerations and potential downstream impacts.
4. Ecosystem-Based Approaches/ Nature-based Solutions: IFM recognizes the importance of ecosystems in regulating water flow and reducing the impacts of floods. Preserving and restoring wetlands, forests, and other natural features can contribute to sustainable flood management
5. Early Warning Systems: Flood warnings are issued when there is an immanent risk of disastrous flooding based on meteorological or hydrological forecasting so the damage can be reduced and people can be evacuated. These Early Warning Systems are an essential component of IFM, reducing the risk by allowing stakeholders to prepare for a flood event to reduce or mitigate their impact.
6. Community-based management: Including knowledge on local conditions can help to understand and mitigate the flood risk. In addition, can the engagement of local communities help to increase the acceptance of measures as well as increase their effectiveness.
7. Managing Residual Risks: In most cases, it is not possible to remove flood risk completely. Therefore managing the residual flood risk is part of IDM. It includes contingency planning and emergency response as well as recovery plans by building back better.

== Examples of countries where IFM is applied ==
1. Netherlands: The Netherlands is known for its integrated approach to water management, including flood protection. The country employs a combination of dikes, polders, floodplains, and adaptive strategies to manage flood risk. Initially, polders had primarily agricultural function, contributing to agricultural production. Currently their function vary, including: flood control, agricultural, industrial, recreational, landscape and geodiversity and biodiversity protection functions."
2. Bangladesh: Bangladesh has implemented community-based approaches to flood management, involving local residents in the construction and maintenance of embankments, early warning systems, and other protective measures.
