= Building Back Better =

United Nations program

Building Back Better, or more frequently termed Build Back Better (BBB), is a strategy aimed at reducing the risk to the people of nations and communities in the wake of future disasters and shocks. It is a conceptual strategy that has continued to evolve since its origination in May 2005. However, what continues to be the overall goal is enabling countries and communities to be stronger and more resilient following a disaster by reducing vulnerability to future disasters. Building resilience entails addressing physical, social, environmental, and economic vulnerabilities and shocks.

The term BBB was first used in the World Bank's Preliminary Stocktake of the damage and destruction from the December 2004 tsunami to Aceh and Nias, that was published in May 2005. This stocktake included the early identification of key requirements for recovery and reconstruction. It was in the identification of these requirements that BBB had its roots in the improvement of land use, spatial planning and construction standards through the reconstruction and recovery process, as well as the protection and formalization of land rights. The concept has expanded to represent a broader opportunity by building greater resilience in recovery by systematically addressing the root causes of vulnerability. It was former United States President, Bill Clinton, in his role as United Nations Special Envoy for Tsunami Recovery, who drew the attention of both the United Nations and the world, to the term BBB, in his address to the United Nations in July 2005.

Almost a decade later, BBB was described in the United Nations' (UN) Sendai Framework for Disaster Risk Reduction document, which was agreed on at the Third UN World Conference on Disaster Risk Reduction held on March 14–18, 2015, in Sendai, Japan. It was subsequently adopted by the UN member states at the UN General Assembly on June 3, 2015, as one of four priorities in the Sendai Framework for disaster recovery, risk reduction and sustainable development.

From its genesis in 2005 for the reconstruction of Aceh and Nias in Indonesia, and since the UN endorsement of the Sendai Framework in 2015, the concept of BBB has continued to evolve with its history of adoption in recovery and reconstruction operations following major disasters around the globe. These disasters have included Hurricane Katrina on the Gulf Coast of the United States in August 2005, the 2005 Kashmir earthquake in Pakistan, the 2010 Haiti earthquake, Super Typhoon Yolanda in the Philippines in November 2013 and the April 2015 Nepal earthquake (Gorkha earthquake).

== Origins of BBB - Aceh and Nias in Indonesia after the 2004 Tsunami ==
=== Conception ===
The magnitude of the devastation and loss of human life caused by the 2004 Indian Ocean Tsunami to Aceh and Nias initiated a change to the mindset of post-disaster reconstruction. Typically, the response to a disaster would entail repairing and rebuilding the physical damage to houses, infrastructure and the built environment back to the pre-disaster status. However, in Indonesia it was seen that this would potentially expose people and communities to similar risks and consequences should another major disaster strike. The government and international agencies concluded that reconstruction was an opportunity to address vulnerabilities of people and communities. It was understood that, although natural disasters were usually unavoidable, it was possible to reduce future losses through improved construction standards, better spatial planning, early warning and education. Thus, the term BBB was conceived in Indonesia by the World Bank, along with other international agencies, and the Badan Rehabilitasi dan Rekonstruksi (BRR) Nanggroe Aceh Darussalam (NAD) and Nias, i.e. the Agency for the Rehabilitation and Reconstruction of Aceh and Nias, in the months following the tsunami as planning for recovery and reconstruction was undertaken.

The term BBB was first published in the Preliminary Stocktake of May 2005, task managed by the World Bank's Wolfgang Fengler. An updated stocktake was prepared for the October 2005 Brief for the Coordination Forum Aceh and Nias (CFAN), and this was also led by The World Bank.

The Preliminary Stocktake drew upon the Indonesian government's own Master Plan for the coordination and implementation of recovery programs in Aceh and Nias and the initial Damage and Loss Assessment. The Master Plan was prepared in consultation with international bodies including agencies of the United Nations, the World Bank and the Asian Development Bank. Although the Master Plan proposed sixteen core policies each with key broad strategies for implementation, it did not explicitly mention BBB. However, the Master Plan was explicit in the need for: “Mitigation and preparedness in the event of future natural disasters was highlighted as integral to the reconstruction”.

It was the core policies and broad strategies in the Master Plan that enabled the thinking to establish the concept of BBB. For example, policies 9-11 were especially identified during the early considerations for recovery of land rights and titling commencing in February 2005 which led to the project preparation of the first major reconstruction project by the World Bank - the Reconstruction of Aceh Land Administration System (RALAS) project in April–June 2005. RALAS also addressed many of the other policies in the original Master Plan as relevant to the project context. The other reconstruction projects prepared by the World Bank that followed also addressed the Master Plan's policies.

There were eleven World Bank projects funded under the Multi-Donor Trust Fund for Aceh and Nias (MDF), including RALAS, with approved funding of around US$500 million and all subscribing to BBB. Josef Lloyd Leitmann was the World Bank's initial program manager for MDF. Keith Clifford Bell was the World Bank's task manager for RALAS. Soon after the MDF's approval of RALAS, a few further projects were approved in August 2005, but implementation of these did not commence until 2006. These projects included the Urban Community Recovery (UPP) program for restoring infrastructure in 352 urban villages (valued at US$18 million), task managed by George Soraya, and the Rural Community Recovery (Kecamatan Development Program, KDP) program for assisting some 3,000 villages to develop community based infrastructure (valued at US$64 million), under the task management of Scott Guggenheim. Also approved was the Tsunami Recovery Waste Management, (US$15 million).

Knowledge of the characteristics of the disaster and its impacts including deaths and injuries, destruction and damage to assets, infrastructure and land, as well as the impacts on the economy and livelihoods were essential to approach BBB. Social and cultural impacts were also important to assess. Although BBB was not mentioned, in the Master Plan, it was clear it was about “Mitigation and preparedness in the event of future natural disasters was highlighted as integral to the reconstruction”. Furthermore, the geographical locations and extents of impacts are essential and are aided by reliable and accessible pre- and post-disaster mapping and geospatial information. The preparation of the Preliminary Stocktake was cognizant of these factors, contributing to the formulation of the BBB concept.

In order to build back better, a reliable assessment of losses was clearly essential. Early estimates of the deaths and damage, drawing upon the initial World Bank Preliminary Stocktake of May 2005, actually put the death toll at around 150,000 dead, with 127,000 houses destroyed and 500,000 left homeless. Over time, as more detailed assessments were undertaken, the tolls rose. Contributory factors to needing to revise statistics on loss and damage were due to unreliable government records including periodic censuses, pursuit of haste driven by development agencies and civil society wanting to contribute aid, lack of expertise in damage assessment much of which was initially crowd-sourced, poor or inadequate mapping (geospatial information). It was subsequently estimated that of the estimated 230,000 tsunami deaths across fourteen countries, up to 220,000 deaths were in Aceh Province and the island of Nias (in the province of North Sumatra) alone. By way of comparison, the death toll in Aceh and Nias actually exceeded both atomic bombings of Hiroshima and Nagasaki combined in World War 2. Other losses and damages in Aceh and Nias included more than 230 km of roads damaged or destroyed and 9 seaports damaged. Also, two hospitals were destroyed, and five hospitals were severely damaged along with 26 primary health care centers identified as being destroyed. There were 1,488 schools destroyed leaving around 150,000 children without access to education. The total value of damage and losses in Aceh and Nias was estimated at around US$4.45 billion, which was equivalent to Aceh's annual Gross Domestic Product (GDP).

To plan for building back better, it was important to have fully considered the cause and magnitude of the disaster itself. Geophysical experts have determined that the tsunami was caused by what has been named as the Sumatra-Andaman earthquake which occurred on December 26, 2004, at 07:58:53 local time. This was a major earthquake with a magnitude of 9.1–9.3 Mw and its epicenter was around 240 kilometers (150 miles) off the coast of North Sumatra, Indonesia. The sheer magnitude of this earthquake was estimated to have generated an energy release equivalent to 23,000 Hiroshima-type atomic bombs, i.e. each being 15 kilotons of TNT. Banda Aceh was the urban location closest to the earthquake’s epicenter where tsunami waves soared to more than 30 meters (100 feet) and travelled across the Indian Ocean at more than 800 kilometers per hour (500 miles per hour).

Global attention was drawn to the term BBB arising from the address by UN Special Envoy for Tsunami Recovery Bill Clinton to the United Nations Economic and Social Council (ECOSOC) in July 2005. Clinton first visited Aceh in May 2005 in his role as Special Envoy. However, he had earlier visited Aceh in February 2005 with former US President George H. W. Bush. Clinton's May 2005 visit included meetings with the World Bank, BRR, as well as multilaterals and civil society. Clinton's reporting drew heavily from his briefings from the World Bank and BRR and the aforementioned Preliminary Stocktaking Report published in May 2005 by the World Bank.

Twelve months after the tsunami struck, a Joint Report was published by BRR and development partners and released through the World Bank. The report has forewords by then Indonesian President, Susilo Bambang Yudhoyono, and Special Envoy Clinton. However, the report reveals many of the challenges facing reconstruction and recovery across all sectors including land. Indirectly, it illustrates why recovery and reconstruction is so difficult unless a prior plan and system is in place. Recovery and reconstruction is more than just access to funds as it requires strong coordination as well as an effective monitoring and evaluation system which is location-based.

=== RALAS ===
Specifically, the BBB Strategy was conceived during the preparation of the RALAS project, by the World Bank, under the umbrella of the MDF, during April–June 2005. RALAS was the first reconstruction project initiated and approved for funding under MDF with an allocation of US$28 million. The concept and context of BBB arose in discussions between the World Bank RALAS project task team and the BRR. RALAS was implemented by Badan Pertanahan Nasional (BPN), i.e. the National Land Authority of Indonesia.

As the first project to embrace BBB, RALAS intentionally focused on the sustainability and resilience of communities to future disasters and also conflict. At the time of RALAS approval, the Aceh Civil War, known as the Insurgency in Aceh had been underway since 1976. The conflict ended with the truce agreement signed in Helsinki on August 15, 2005.

Key achievements under RALAS included:

- community land mapping of more than 330,000 land parcels over Aceh and Nias enabling housing reconstruction to proceed more quickly with confidence
- 230,000 new titles issued to legitimate owners by project closure on June 30, 2009, and more than 300,000 titles following project closure
- Acehnese women afforded equal land rights for the first time in Aceh’s history and thirty percent of all titles issued under RALAS was to women
- new spatial planning undertaken for the reallocation of land
- government and civil society worked closely with mosques to ensure inheritance rights, especially for widows and orphans
- reconstruction of earthquake resistant land offices
- computerization of all land records
- secure storage of land records, including off-site backup
- new improved procedures for access to land records and land registration services.

The World Bank maintained a strong, full-time presence in Aceh, from March 2005 when RALAS project preparation commenced until RALAS closed in June 2009. This presence enabled the World Bank to work closely with BPN, civil society and UN agencies throughout the RALAS implementation, providing technical support as well as close monitoring and supervision.

Clinton specifically commented on RALAS after his first visit as the Special Envoy in May 2005:

"I can think of nothing that will generate more income over the long run for average families in this region than actually having title to the land they own," he said. "Then, they will be able to borrow money and build a much more diversified, much more modern economy."

Prior to the tsunami, less than twenty percent of landowners in Aceh and Nias had legal title. The majority of land records held by BPN in Aceh were either severely damaged or destroyed in the tsunami. At the time of Clinton’s first visit, it was reported in the media, including The Sydney Morning Herald (Australia), that just 25 people who lost their homes in Aceh could prove their title to land. This was a major concern for rebuilding homes on rightfully owned properties. Subsequently, given slow progress, Clinton himself was to raise concerns over delays with RALAS, which he did as early as December 2006. That was eighteen months after the approval of RALAS in June 2005 and sixteen months after project commencement in August 2005. Restoration of BPN's land records (approximately 30 tonnes) from Aceh, supported by Japan, was to take almost three years.

RALAS implementation faced many challenges including BPN capacity, where some forty staff in Banda Aceh had been killed in the tsunami. The project experienced delays due to capacity, procurement and governance and there was only a small quantity of land titles issued during the first two years. Whilst the project targets were challenging and ambitious, they were not unrealistic. RALAS experienced delays along with most other reconstruction projects. Although the final project results were not fully satisfactory, overall, most were achieved and only around US$15 million of the allocated US$28 million was expended.

== Introduction of the concept to the United Nations - 2005 ==
The term BBB was first introduced to the UN at ECOSOC in July 2005 by Clinton, the UN Secretary-General’s Special Envoy for Tsunami Recovery. Clinton drew heavily from the briefings on Aceh and Nias, especially from the World Bank, BRR, the Asian Development Bank (ADB) and notably from the special preliminary stocktaking report (May 2005) prepared by the World Bank. Clinton's address and (written report) included ten key propositions for BBB. Preparedness to deal with future disasters and building resilience were key propositions. Also, the importance of effective coordination by government of the efforts of international development agencies including UN agencies, multilaterals such as the World Bank and ADB, civil society and NGOs. Clinton also stressed the important roles of communities to drive recovery and reconstruction efforts and ensuring that communities were left safer by reducing risks and building resilience. The impact on livelihoods was not forgotten by Clinton and also the need to strengthen government institutions at local levels to foster recovery. Clearly, there is a fair degree of correlation between a number of Clinton's propositions for BBB and what was ultimately defined as the BBB core principles (discussed later).

== The Sendai Framework - 2015 ==
During the negotiation period for the Sendai Framework, the concept of "Build Back Better" was proposed by the Japanese delegation as a holistic concept which states: "The principle of 'Build Back Better' is generally understood to use the disaster as a trigger to create more resilient nations and societies than before. This was through the implementation of well-balanced disaster risk reduction measures, including physical restoration of infrastructure, revitalization of livelihood and economy/industry, and the restoration of local culture and environment". The concept was fully agreed as one of the most important concepts among each state's delegates and embedded into what is known as the Sendai Framework.

At the opening speech of the Third UN World Conference on Disaster Risk Reduction, held March 14–18, 2015, in Sendai, Japan Shinzo Abe, Prime Minister of Japan, stated: "The word of "Build Back Better" sounds like a new concept, but this is common sense to the Japanese people, coming from our historical experiences in recovering from disaster and preparing for the future, and it has become an important part of the culture of Japan."

The Sendai Framework explicitly identified Building Back Better in recovery, reconstruction, and rehabilitation. The framework was adopted by UN member states as one of four priorities in the Sendai Framework for disaster recovery, risk reduction and sustainable development. The UN General Assembly adopted this document on June 3, 2015.

The United Nations Office for Disaster Risk Reduction has issued a volume of its Words into Action guidelines for BBB. While there can be no standardized blueprint for building back better, the guidelines offer step-by-step guidance on developing disaster recovery frameworks, pre-disaster recovery planning and post-disaster needs assessment.

After the Sendai Framework for Disaster Risk Reduction was finalized, the performance indicators were defined as: "The use of the recovery, rehabilitation, and reconstruction phases after a disaster to increase the resilience of nations and communities through integrating disaster risk reduction measures into the restoration of physical infrastructure and societal systems, and into the revitalization of livelihoods, economies and the environment. Annotation: The term 'societal' will not be interpreted as a political system of any country."

Following the UN Conference in Sendai, BBB was also included in the book Disaster Risk Reduction for Economic Growth and Livelihood, Investing in Resilience and Development, Chapter 7 "Recovery and reconstruction: An opportunity for sustainable growth through 'build back better'". Arguably, although the term BBB had been used by many people involved in the recovery process from natural disasters since 2005, perhaps BBB had not been as clearly described as a holistic concept before this book.

BBB was not "first coined" by the Sendai Framework as claimed by some international agencies and researchers. Rather, it was the Sendai Framework that enabled BBB's endorsement by the UN in June 2015.

== BBB Core Principles ==
Since the initial conception of BBB, and various applications of it following disasters around the global and also following Sendai, it would seem there is a wide acceptance of the seven core principles which were well articulated at the World Reconstruction Conference 4, held May 13, 2019 - May 14, 2019 Geneva, Switzerland, convened by the World Bank and the Global Facility for Disaster Reduction and Recovery (GFDRR). GFDRR is a global partnership program, under the administration of the World Bank, and was established in September 2006. Notably, there is a degree of correlation between a number of the aforementioned Clinton's propositions for BBB core principles.

In consideration of the seven core principles, it would be appropriate to consider these under four core themes:

=== People and communities ===
- "People affected by disaster should be the decision-makers." Government and development agencies should work with people and communities to ensure that needs are met and communities and people own outcomes.
- "Reconstruction and recovery efforts must recognize diversity." Aceh demonstrated the important roles especially of women in reconstruction of housing and communities.
- "Communities should be allowed to use their own resources wherever possible." The use of local resources promotes the local economy and rebuilds livelihoods. It can also assist with inflationary pressures.

=== Governance and accountability ===
"Agencies must be accountable to the people they seek to assist." Governance is paramount and corruption may be high risk.

=== Economic and Financial ===
- "Recovery of local economy and livelihoods must be a priority." The financial and economic shocks of major disasters present major challenges to recovery and reconstruction enabling return to what is considered normal. Reconstruction efforts can enable these through utilizing local people to support reconstruction and drawing on local materials and resources as may be available.

=== Future Risk Management ===
- "Do no harm: learn from the past and avoid unnecessary damage to future recovery." This extends especially to social and cultural issues.
- "Reconstruction must take account of future hazards and risks." This is fundamental to BBB.

== Mapping, Geospatial Information and Land Tenure ==
Geospatial information, including mapping and broader location-based information, fulfills key roles in all stages of disasters before and after a disaster strikes. Such information is essential for emergency response to deliver assistance and undertake evacuations. Coordination of emergency response and monitoring progress is largely driven on a location-basis. Agencies delivering aid require coordination to enable delivery to where it is needed. For recovery and reconstruction geospatial information assists in damage and loss assessments and enables planning, monitoring and evaluation of progress. Mapping supports and enables immediate or early identification of losses, delivering emergency aid, evacuations, coordination, and monitoring. Further, geospatial information plays important roles in preventing mitigation. Successful BBB requires geospatial information to support all stages.

Many developing countries that experience major disasters lack reliable, authoritative land tenure where landowners have secure rights. Aceh and Nias experienced the 2004 tsunami at a time when a maximum of only twenty percent of landowners had formally registered land ownership through title deeds. The destruction of legal evidence of ownership along with the physical evidence of ownership (boundary demarcation by walls and fences) was further exacerbated by the loss of human evidence. In many areas, even the evidence of roads, which were the boundaries to many properties, was gone. In some locations, up to ninety percent of land occupants were killed often leaving young heirs without any evidence of inheritance. The Indonesian government and development agencies were quick to realize that building back required confidence in property ownership boundaries.

The Aceh and Nias Master Plan established the importance of geospatial information and land tenure boundaries, and these considerations were embraced within BBB in the Preliminary Stocktake by the World Bank and prioritization of the first MDF approved reconstruction project RALAS.

The availability of geospatial information for disaster response, recovery and reconstruction has been frequently raised as an issue. In response to a request from the Indonesian government (GOI) for mapping assistance, the Australia Indonesia Partnership for Reconstruction commissioned a study in August 2005 and one of its key findings was: “The lack of appropriate, reliable, standardized and current maps is hindering progress on the reconstruction effort, a situation that will become worse unless immediate action is taken to accelerate the production of new spatial data and maps and provide improved access to information for teams on the ground. There have been several proposals put forward by GoI agencies and NGOs for ODAs to fund the preparation of image and different scale topographical maps.”

However, it was also found that despite much mapping already having been undertaken, including through cooperation between the Australian Defence Force and Indonesia, the government agencies actually refused to share mapping with development agencies including BRR. The report identified that some of the mapping had been repeated up to five times. For the RALAS project, the World Bank was able to secure around €0.5 million in mapping assistance using satellite imagery from the European Union.

The Haiti earthquake response was hindered by lack of mapping. Initial requirements were met through the Volunteered Geographic Information (VGI), also called crowd-sourced mapping provided through OpenStreetMap. VGI was very useful, in terms of emergency response stage. However, as it progressed to recovery and reconstruction, the need for more authoritative mapping which was later led by the United States.

VGI does have many limitations in terms of reliability and was found wanting in the response to Super Typhoon Yolanda especially in terms of its damage assessment support where it was concluded to not be reliable enough. In cases like Hurricane Katrina in 2005 and the 2011 Christchurch earthquake the authoritative mapping of the respective government agencies was very reliable and very effectively supported the emergency response and the subsequent recovery and reconstruction operations.

It is also important to appreciate the importance of pre-disaster mapping and imagery and being able to utilize these in conjunction with new mapping and imagery. For example, comparing what existed before with what has resulted after the disaster, provides the basis of reliability of damage and loss assessment.

The Pacific Island nations are considered to be amongst the most prone countries to disaster and climate risks. These include tsunamis, earthquakes, volcanic eruptions, cyclones, landslides and floods. Geospatial and related information were identified as critical requirements to support risk mitigation, response and recovery consistent with BBB. Thus, the Pacific Risk Information System (PacRIS), was established in 2012 by the World Bank funded Pacific Catastrophe Risk Financing and Insurance Initiative (PCRAFI). PacRIS has assembled the largest collection of geo-referenced datasets in the Pacific region.

== Benefits ==
=== Investment in Resilience ===
Building disaster-resilient infrastructure and early warning systems is costly, but typically yields benefits 4-36 times higher than initial outlay. However, there is a need to ensure there is maintenance of systems and assets, or else investments may be wasted and with catastrophic consequences. As reported later, there are clear lessons arising from the 2018 Sulawesi tsunami disaster where government failed to maintain the early warning system installed as part of the post 2004 tsunami BBB reconstruction.

Furthermore, it has been identified that resilience to natural shocks may be strengthened through better reconstruction processes. For example, adopting standards for earthquake-resistant housing and buildings will reduce damage from subsequent earthquakes. Through planning approvals, build housing only in areas which are deemed less vulnerable to flooding and in areas which have been subject to flooding, rebuild with a free-board consideration so that the habitable areas of houses and buildings are above designated flood levels. In coastal areas prone to surge, resilience can be enhanced by not occupying land below the Mean High-Water Mark (MHWM) and, in some circumstances, pulling well back from MHWM. This means only occupying lands that are above MHWM and possibly a significant height above MHWM to minimize risk due to tidal surge. Significantly, this may mean a change to land rights. Those foreshore areas left vacant after pulling back would become public open space. An example of this was in Leyte after the Yolanda disaster, where Bell of the World Bank advised on a "no occupancy" and "no build" zone for impacted foreshore properties, which was subsequently fixed at 40 meters setback from MHWM for residential purposes but without change for business purposes (viz. mainly fishing). This required changes to land property boundaries leading to complaints and disputes with local landowners. However, it was a government decision to enable building back better with risk reduction. Thus, with such setbacks from established MHWM, this would usually mean that such foreshore areas are reserved as public open space.

Disasters often have devastating impacts on the economic, social, and environmental well-being of countries, regions, cities and communities. History has repeatedly shown that disasters can recur with similar or even greater impacts. Thus, it’s especially important that post-disaster rebuilding adopts approaches and standards to help mitigate and reduce future disaster damage, i.e. build back better. The United States Federal Emergency Management Agency (FEMA) has advised that disaster mitigation and building resilience, through what is deemed BBB, has three primary benefits to help reduce future costs: “ Breaking the disaster-rebuild-disaster cycle”; “Strengthening existing infrastructure” and “Reducing down time for businesses and critical public facilities and services”. FEMA has reported that for every $1 spent on disaster preparedness, $4 is saved in the disaster itself.

In India, super-cyclone BOB06 killed more than 10,000 people in 1999. During recovery, the state government established the Odisha State Disaster Mitigation Authority (OSDMA) to help facilitate loss prevention through programs such as adding over 1,500 km (930 mi) of new evacuation roads, 30 bridges to better connect vulnerable communities and improvements to 200 km (120 mi) of existing coastal embankments. Additionally, the OSDMA invested in advanced early warning systems. Such investments in future disaster loss prevention have been, in retrospect, important inputs to what was later termed BBB. When Odisha was hit by Cyclone Phailin in 2013, 50 people were killed, which was less than 1 percent of BOB06's casualties.

=== Stimulation of local economies ===
In Madagascar, farmers benefited as much as 4.5 times their income after the risk of flooding was reduced through watershed protection in Mantadia National Park. In India, following the 2001 Gujarat earthquake, the Self-Employed Women's Association (SEWA) set up learning centers for local women to facilitate recovery which included tools, techniques and information about government schemes. These centers sustained the economic activities of women and have served as focal points during flood recovery since the earthquake.

=== Other benefits ===
The benefits of BBB extend beyond risk reduction. In Malaysia, the government did not only save an estimated cost of US$300,000/km by maintaining the mangrove swamps intact for storm protection and flood control, but also lowered the temperature in the area.

=== Variants of BBB and benefits ===
Three key variants of BBB, viz. “Building Back Stronger”, “Building Back Faster”, and “Building Back More Inclusively”, have been raised by World Bank, GFDRR and others. The World Bank has reported that if all three approaches to BBB were to be implemented together, the impact of disasters could be reduced by almost 31 percent. Prior to 2018, estimation of losses based entirely on asset losses at around US$300 billion per year. However, further research by World Bank-GFDRR has reported on the need to also consider losses to well-being and this raises the annual estimate of losses to around US$520 billion. Thus, the implementation of these three BBB variants together, equates to around US$173 billion annual in avoided cost of losses and damages.

== 2018 Sulawesi Tsunami Disaster - A Lesson in Government Failure ==
Given that the declared motto of the reconstruction of Aceh and Nias was “build back better” following the 2004 Boxing Day tsunami, it was something that should have resonated strongly with the Indonesia government and people. BBB aimed to support achieving a higher level of governance, better infrastructure, social services and a stronger level of economic activity than existed before the tsunami. Also, BBB’s post-tsunami response provided early warning to enable communities and individuals to be provided with sufficient advance warning to enable them to urgently move to safe locations. The early warning system was for all of Indonesia and not just Aceh and Nias. Indonesia comprises thousands of islands and is part of the largest archipelago in the world, the Malay Archipelago, between the Pacific and Indian Oceans. Following the 2004 Indian Ocean tsunami, Indonesia installed an advanced tsunami warning system, comprising a network of 21 buoys to provide advance warnings based on data gathered by deep sea sensors. With this investment, Indonesia should have been well-prepared for future shocks and the traumatic Aceh and Nias experience forever entrenched in the country’s government. The system was designed to provide early warning to communities and citizens and sound alarms. Such a system can help prevent loss of life and injuries. No early warning system can prevent destruction of housing, infrastructure and assets.

However, on September 28, 2018, a powerful earthquake off the Indonesian island of Sulawesi on Friday caused a tsunami resulted in thousands of deaths and massive losses. The 2018 Sulawesi earthquake and tsunami resulted in a reported 4,340 killed and 10,679 injured with almost 700 missing. At least 70,000 houses were destroyed and more than 200,000 left homeless.

The Indonesian system failed to prevent the huge loss of life. Many of the buoys did not work, with some having been damaged by vandals and others stolen. The government had failed to maintain the system by providing sufficient funding. The lack of funding impacted the ability of all buoys to function. Had apathy crept in almost after almost fourteen years since Boxing Day 2004? It was reported the system for Sulawesi had not been fully operational since 2012. So, although some warnings were issued to residents mainly via SMS TXT, the majority of people did not receive or heed such warnings. This was further exacerbated by the failure of any warning alarms to alert people to the tsunami.

The key lesson in all of this is that outcomes of BBB should never be taken for granted and presumed that all is well because investments were made. Systems must be maintained, and people must be regularly reminded to be aware of alerts and alarms. The government must remain vigilant and ensure that it provides sufficient funding for system operation, maintenance, and capital improvement. It must also monitor the security of systems to reduce theft and vandalism. The Indonesian government failed with the Sulawesi tsunami, and the impacts were truly catastrophic.

== Pakistan - Kashmir 2005 Earthquake Reconstruction ==
The October 8, 2005 Kashmir earthquake is an example that drew upon the learnings of the response to the 2004 tsunami disaster in Aceh and Nias. The destruction saw greater than 73,000 deaths and around 2.8 million people left homeless. The Pakistan Government embraced the BBB concept where it identified the large-scale devastation as a “window of opportunity to improve the prevalent methods and quality of construction”. In particular, the government saw the development of seismic-resistant structural designs as core to its BBB mantra. It also saw the opportunity to support the economy and livelihoods by utilizing local and regional construction materials which were available in quantities to support rebuilding. The government requested the World Bank and the Asian Development Bank to undertake a preliminary damage and needs assessment. This assessment was prepared on the basis of globally accepted standards for the quantification of post-disaster damage and needs. The assessment established that it would require around US$5.2 billion for reconstruction, which allowed for around US$1.4 billion for rebuilding damaged and destroyed houses. Thus, the Rural Housing Reconstruction Program (RHRP) was conceived at a cost estimate of over US$1.5 billion. RHRP was prepared in collaboration with international development agencies including the World Bank and the Asian Development Bank. The World Bank’s financial assistance for housing reconstruction was US$210 million. Interestingly the World Bank-GFDRR Rural Housing Reconstruction Program manual was not published until May 2013, and drew heavily from over seven years reconstruction experience in Kashmir.

Some of the main features of BBB included seismic-resistant housing reconstruction, maximization of community engagement, with training, to support an owner-driven, assisted, and inspected reconstruction regime. Under RHRP, the seismic-resistant reconstruction was enabled through the development of appropriate construction standards and structural design options using local materials and knowledge. Also, large-scale training of a critical mass of building tradespeople was undertaken. Homeowners were also trained in the use of these standards and other requirements for housing reconstruction in a work-safe manner.

== Haiti 2010 Earthquake ==
The term BBB was actually used in 2009 by Clinton while referring to Haiti after the political upheaval and storms of 2008. However, BBB was first used in the context of the massive Haiti earthquake disaster by UN Secretary-General Ban Ki-Moon in February 2010.

The earthquake which struck Haiti on January 12, 2010, killed an estimated 200,000 people in the Port-au-Prince metropolitan area and neighboring zones. As a result of extensive devastation, hundreds of thousands of survivors were left homeless. One of the early actions of the government was to relocate 400,000 people to camps outside Port-au-Prince. The World Bank drew on its experiences from Aceh and a number of the key World Bank experts were engaged to support the response to Haiti. Like Haiti, after the 2004 Tsunami, Aceh experienced generous inflows of financial assistance from the international development community from around the world. Significantly, the pledged financial assistance was considered to be sufficient to “build back better".

In order to support the Haitian government planning and design for recovery and reconstruction operations, the World Bank and GFDRR mobilized the World Bank Global Expert Team (GET) drawing on inhouse experts (several who had worked in Aceh on initial BBB, including Fengler, Guggenheim, Leitmann and Bell) and supplemented by external consultant experts. An early task was to prepare Knowledge/Good Practice Notes on what were identified as the ten priority recovery and reconstruction issues, viz. Building Seismic Safety Assessment; Debris Management; Environmental and Social Assessment; Experience with Post Disaster Income Support Programs; Land Tenure; Management of Recovery Managing Post-Disaster Aid; Rebuild or Relocate; Transitional Shelter, and; Helping Women and Children to Recover and Build Resilient Communities. A key message from GET was that it was possible for Haiti to build back better after the devastating earthquake as had been proven in Aceh and Nias after the tsunami. Government leadership was identified as the key factor for successful recovery in Haiti and it was essential for the international development community to strengthen the government’s role to lead Haiti’s recovery and avoid fragment of assistance.

== Nepal 2015 Gorkha Earthquake and Disaster Management ==
The April 2015 Nepal earthquake (also known as the Gorkha earthquake) resulted in almost 9,000 deaths and 22,000 injured. Damages were assessed at greater than US$7 billion, and it was estimated that almost 1 million citizens were pushed into poverty. The disaster impacted at least 8 million people, equivalent to around 30 percent of the population. Fundamental to Nepal’s reconstruction was BBB, with the additional qualification of “leave no one behind”. Nepal has a long recurrent history of earthquakes, so reconstruction focused on ensuring seismic resistance to enable resilience to future shocks and stresses based on international standards. Training of engineers, tradespeople and homeowners was provided and there was a significant emphasis on instilling a safer construction culture where everyone was familiar with the compliance measures necessary for resilient construction.

Nepal’s Ministry of Home Affairs publishes a biennial Nepal Disaster Report (NDR) which especially embraces the agreements of the Sendai Framework. This biennial report was first published for the period 2007-09. Given the disaster-prone nature of Nepal which include earthquakes, landslides and fires, the NDR continues to be very much focused on disaster management and resilience. Thus, Nepal through its biennially revised NDR, fosters principles of risk-informed development, and socially inclusive approaches for disaster management and risk reduction.

== Other Post-disaster Applications of BBB ==
During the reconstruction from the earthquake of Central Java in March 2006, the Japan International Cooperation Agency (JICA) Reconstruction team adopted the BBB concept to support housing reconstruction. They used earthquake-resistant technology and constructed more than 100,000 strengthened houses within two years under the leadership of Java Special Province.

After the major disaster in Java, international donors collaborated on a report: the Post Disaster Needs Assessment (PDNA). In the PDNA for Tropical Storm Ondoy in September 2009 and Typhoon Pepeng in the Philippines, PDNA team member Takeya Kimio from the Asian Development Bank strongly recommended BBB in disaster recovery. They wanted to make sure that BBB was first used in the Philippines government reconstruction policy document. BBB was also clearly written as a catchphrase on the first page of the document titled "Reconstruction Assistance on Yolanda".

== Ukraine Building Back Better ==
The World Bank, in 2024, estimated the total cost of the damage from Russian aggression to the Ukrainian building stock at over USD 50 billion, with more than USD 68 billion needed for reconstruction. In March 2024, the European Commission announced its support for building back better for Ukraine with its first disbursement of EUR 50 billion support programme for 2024-27, including EUR 38.27 billion into supporting the state budget. The program encompasses reconstruction of buildings, infrastructure, energy and other services.

== BBB has Continued to Evolve in its Scope ==
International development agencies, including the World Bank, United Nations organizations, civil society and academe have continued to present views on the evolution, or extension, of BBB, beyond post-disaster rehabilitation and reconstruction. Broader contexts for BBB have included the global covid pandemic, low carbon, climate change, green growth, the digital economy and addressing inequality. Consistent with good BBB practices, the importance of investing in geospatial information and mapping through national and regional spatial data infrastructures as well as comprehensive land administration systems that address land rights, planning development and other land-related themes are also frequently reported.

== Further Researcher Considerations ==
The topics of recovery, reconstruction and building resilience, which draw upon the BBB concepts and experienced around the globe have been reported by many academics and researchers. Examples included here are:

- The researched book by Mannakkara, Wilkinson and Potangaroa called Resilient Post Disaster Recovery through Building Back Better developed a framework for BBB, including indicators that have been tested in a number of countries. In the book, the authors argue for a holistic approach incorporating disaster risk reduction activities with community engagement, effective monitoring and implementation. Those arguments could generally be consistent with the key tenets of the BBB core principles.
- For a critical account of the concept and its usage in the context of attempts by states, multilateral agencies and NGOs to use disasters for projects of neoliberal enclosure and disaster capitalism, see Raja Swamy's "Building Back Better in India: Development, NGOs, and Artisanal Fishers after the 2004 Tsunami" Swamy calls attention to how narratives of betterment dominate official discourses of disaster recovery, linking recovery with the needs and goals of capital while aiding in the further dispossession and marginalization of affected populations.

== See also ==
- Disaster capitalism
