= Grace Ebun Delano =

Nigerian nurse and midwife (born 1935)

- Born: 13 November 1935 (age 90); Kaduna
- Occupation: Nurse
- Known for: Work in Reproductive Health in Nigeria

Grace Ebun Delano (born 13 November 1935, in Kaduna) is a Nigerian nurse and midwife who has played a key role in pioneering family planning and reproductive health services in Nigeria. She co-founded the Association for Reproductive and Family Health of which she was director for many years, has acted as a consultant for many different organisations across Africa, and has written and co-authored numerous books and articles on women's health and related topics. In 1993, she was given the World Health Organization Sasakawa Award for her work in health development.

== Early life and education ==
Grace Ebun-Oluwa Samuel was born in Kaduna on 13 November 1935 to Yoruba parents. Her name Ebun-Oluwa means gift from God in Yoruba: she was born unexpectedly to a forty-four-year-old mother with one other child, a ten-year-old boy. She grew up aware that her mother had a series of difficulties with pregnancy and child mortality.

Her mother, who had little schooling herself, supported her daughter's enthusiasm for education and let her go to school in Lagos when she was thirteen. However, before Grace moved to Lagos, she attended her first primary school in a mixed school called United Native African School, in Kaduna, in the Northern state of Nigeria from 1940 to 1944. In 1945, she moved to an all-boys school called Government School in Kaduna which was headed by a strict headmaster called Mr. Salako who was forced to admit the first two girls in the school. Delano won a scholarship that allowed her to move to more advanced schools, ending with the Abeokuta Grammar School. With help from her mother and brother Delano travelled to England in 1956 for three years of nursing training. After that she studied midwifery and then trained as a district nurse. This was when she came across women who wanted help to space their pregnancies out, and she took the opportunity to go to lectures in family planning and the use of the diaphragm. Delano returned to Nigeria in 1961 and the following year got a job in the maternity unit at University College Hospital, Ibadan. By then she was married to the future judge Tunde Delano.

== Career ==
Her work as maternity staff nurse led to her joining a project started by an Ibadan University professor, and she became the nurse in charge of the first university teaching hospital family planning programme in Nigeria. Over the years the programme spread from urban to rural areas, and from hospital-based provision to community-based initiatives, including distributing supplies through traditional markets. This work came to involve visits abroad: at first trips to the US for training, and later on Delano went as a consultant to many other African countries. Much of her work was funded or part-funded by international agencies like USAID, Pathfinder International and the Ford Foundation. After she wrote a straightforward informational book on family planning the United Nations Population Fund (UNFPA) paid for it to be printed and distributed in five languages. She went on to write several other books and has written or co-written numerous academic health-related articles. UNFPA also supported her pioneering clinical manual on the IUCD.

In the 1980s she was connected with the Center for Development and Population Activities (CEDPA) which used to organise leadership development training for women, especially supporting health and education initiatives. It is now part of Plan USA. Delano began to feel more confident about public speaking, and went to conferences, meeting other female leaders, and planning strategies to help women, especially with reproductive issues.

While still working within Ibadan University (she left in 1992) Delano started to work with community organisations to develop a new NGO which became the independent Association for Reproductive and Family Health (ARFH). It expanded, added adolescent sexual health and other areas to its concerns and worked with the government on HIV/AIDS projects. ARFH educational and counselling materials are used in many African countries. A key colleague in this work was Professor O.A. Ladipo, president of ARFH. Delano was vice-president and director for more than 25 years. In November 2015, around the time of her 80th birthday, there was an event with retirement and valedictory lectures in her honour. Grace authored many published work. She published 9 research works with 130 citations and 1126 reads that are accessible online.

She is regularly described with phrases like “a veteran reproductive health leader in Nigeria”, and "veteran Nurse/Midwife with an outstanding career in Reproductive Health and Family Planning management spanning over 50 years."

== Positions and awards ==
- Chief Executive and Vice President of the Nigerian Association for Reproductive and Family Health (ARFH)
- World Health Organization Sasakawa Award 1993
- Award of Excellence for significant contributions to the success of the Nigerian Urban Reproductive Health Initiative (NURHI). (Funded by the Bill and Melinda Gates Foundation to increase the use of modern family planning (FP) methods among the urban poor of six cities.)
- Consultant on reproductive health to many organisations in Nigeria and in other African countries.
- Country Co-ordinator for Johns Hopkins School of Public Health - Communication Programs
- Fellow of the West African College of Nursing
- Fellow of Institute for Humanitarian Studies and Social Development
- Secretary General for the Professional Association of Midwives of Nigeria
- Adviser to the International Planned Parenthood Federation
- Award by the Society for Obstetrician and Gynecologists

== Publications ==
- Promoting Dual Protection in Family Planning Clinics In Ibadan Nigeria
- Guide to Family Planning
- Answers to Questions Adolescents Ask on Sexuality
- Implant contraception in an NGO-managed primary health facility in Ibadan, Nigeria
- Assessing the Level of Preparedness of Private Health Providers for Clinical Management of HIV/AIDS Epidemic in Nassarawa State, Nigeria. African Journal of Reproductive Health (AJRH)
- The role of HIV/AIDS prevention campaigns on HIV-related behavioural changes in Ibadan, Nigeria
- Community based distribution agents’ approach to provision of family planning information and services in five Nigerian States: A mirage or a reality?
