= Weather Info for All Initiative =

The Weather Info for All (WIFA) Initiative is a public-private partnership that works to reinforce the capacities and the capabilities of national meteorological services with the goal of supporting local communities worst impacted by climate change through the improvement of weather monitoring. "By bringing together the expertise and resources of different public and private actors, this project may help to save lives and improve the livelihoods of communities in Africa living on the frontlines of climate change." Kofi Annan, President of the Global Humanitarian Forum. The Forum, together with Ericsson, the World Meteorological Organization, National Meteorological Services (NMSs), the Earth Institute at Columbia University, as well as Zain and other mobile phone operators aim to deploy up to 5,000 automatic weather stations (AWSs) at wireless network sites across Africa, where less than 300 are reporting today.

== Background ==
Climate change alters weather patterns and causes an increased number of extreme weather events, impacting heavily on the world’s poorest and most vulnerable communities. A recent Global Humanitarian Forum report estimated that climate change is responsible for some 300,000 deaths each year and over 100 billion US dollars' worth of economic losses, mainly because of shocks to health and agricultural productivity. Sub-Saharan Africa accounts for close to a quarter of these losses, and is the region at the most immediate risk of droughts and floods. Agricultural yields in some areas are expected to fall by 50% as early as 2020.

Adding to the fact that Africa is the continent worst affected by climate change, it also has the weakest weather monitoring system with only one-eighth of the WMO required weather monitoring density and less than 300 weather stations that meet WMO observation requirements. NMSs across Africa, therefore, do not have the necessary means to deliver accurate and timely weather forecasts to end-users, when adequate, environmental information and services can play a crucial role in improving their lives and livelihoods and can contribute to sustaining economic growth, as well as to mitigating natural disasters.

As climate change renders traditional knowledge unreliable, the lack of accurate weather forecasts prevents farmers from making informed decisions, such as when to seed and harvest their crops. Fishermen are also at risk with each year some 5’000 people’s lives being claimed on Lake Victoria alone due to storms and accidents. Accurate weather information is also crucial to understand and take action against the spread of climate-sensitive diseases, as well as for development planning purposes and for expanding access to insurance.

== The Weather Information Gap ==
Annual Global Monitoring 1-15/10/2008 SYNOP reports made at 00,06,12 and 18 UTC at RBSN stations

== The initiative ==
Through the reinforcement of the capacities of the NMSs, the Initiative is a practical solution for adaptation to climate change. It aims at enabling them to deliver more accurate weather forecasts and early warnings to communities throughout Africa as well as to develop new services adapted to various user groups such as farmers, health workers, or government agencies. Harnessing on the opportunities brought by the development of mobile communication in Africa, partners to the Initiative will install up to 5,000 AWSs at new and existing wireless network sites throughout Africa and reinforce the capacities of the NMSs to generate accurate weather forecasts and early warnings.

The data collected by these stations will be analyzed by NMSs and transformed into sector-specific weather forecasts and early warnings distributed to end-users who need it most – farmers, fishermen, rural, and urban communities via a suitable telecoms bearer, for example, SMS.

== Key Outcomes ==
“This initiative may prove to be one of the most important for African meteorology in decades.” Michel Jarraud, Secretary General, World Meteorological Organisation

Better weather monitoring and forecasting capacities of NMSs and increased delivery channels to those who need them most will contribute to saving lives and livelihoods and boosting development progress in a variety of ways:

- Reinforcement of NMSs capacities and capabilities: Installation of AWSs will reinforce the existing observation network and NMSs capacities to allow for the development of improved weather services and the delivery of accurate and adequate weather information to end-users.
- Adaptation to climate change: Accurate information about changing weather patterns assists communities to adapt to the consequences of climatic change.
- Agriculture: Accurate weather information leads to improved agricultural planning and decision-making.
- Development planning: A better understanding of local climate conditions enables better planning and implementation of development strategies.
- Disaster risk reduction: More accurate weather information and early warnings allow for better preparedness to severe weather events, reducing their socio-economic cost.
- Health: Weather forecasts allow for the implementation of preventive measures against climate-sensitive diseases and epidemics, such as malaria, cholera, and dengue fever.
- Insurance: Greater and more accurate weather information provides the basis for weather-index insurances, and allows for the expansion of insurance policies to farmers through micro-insurance schemes.
- Finance: Farmers whose crops are insured through weather index policies have greater possibilities for accessing finance, which can help farmers increase crop yields and incomes.

== Automatic Weather Stations (AWS) ==
AWSs use sensors to take measurements of a variety of meteorological parameters. Those deployed for the Initiative conform to WMO specifications. These units are robust and able to withstand various environmental conditions, yet are economical to operate, calibrate and maintain. They are run on state of the art proprietary software able to handle the reporting of a large network of weather stations and able to detect faulty sensors remotely in real-time. Among other things, automatic weather stations monitor:

- Atmospheric pressure
- Temperature
- Humidity
- Wind speed and direction
- Precipitation
- Sunshine and radiation

Fairmount Weather Systems Limited is the manufacturer of the AWSs being deployed for the Initiative.

== Current status ==
As of the end of June 2009, the Global Humanitarian Forum and its partners have completed Phase I of the Initiative and installed 19 AWSs in three African Great Lakes countries: 1 in Kenya, 9 in Tanzania, and 9 in Uganda. All 19 AWSs are fully operational and successfully transferring raw weather data to the NMSs.

Phase II of the Initiative was expected to begin in the first quarter of 2010. About 500 AWSs will progressively be installed throughout Kenya, Tanzania and Uganda, with the later addition of Burundi and Rwanda.

The Global Humanitarian Forum encountered serious financial difficulties due to which the Forum had to dismiss its staff in March 2010.[1][2] On 31 March 2010, the Swiss Federal Department of Foreign Affairs announced that the Forum was over-indebted and obliged to cease its activity.[3] As of June 2, 2014, the WIFA Initiative seems to be inactive.

== WIFA Launch ==
On June 18, the Global Humanitarian Forum and its President, former UN Secretary-General Kofi Annan, together with its partners announced the Weather Info for All Initiative. The event was held at the Global Platform for Disaster Risk Reduction, in Geneva, Switzerland and was attended by a number of personalities who presented the rationale for this Initiative and its benefits for the world’s poorest and most vulnerable to climate change.

At this occasion, the Forum’s President, Kofi Annan, declared that “The world’s poorest are also the world’s most vulnerable when it comes to the impact of climate change, and the least equipped to deal with its consequences. Today you find cell phone towers in almost every part of Africa. We have never been able to establish weather monitoring on that scale, until now.” Also present at the launch were: Michel Jarraud, Secretary-General of the WMO, Carl-Henric Svanberg, CEO of Ericsson, Lord Simon Cairns, Chairman of Zain Africa, as well as Margareta Wahlström, UN Assistant Secretary-General for Disaster Risk Reduction.

== See also ==
- Climate gap
