= Afghan National Solidarity Programme =

The Afghan National Solidarity Programme (NSP) was an initiative by the government of Afghanistan which aims to rehabilitate and develop around 5 000 villages in Afghanistan. The programme has been funded by US$600 million and, over three years, hopes to develop local democratically elected institutions which will identify, plan and manage for reconstruction in the locality. The project was initially, in its first year, aimed at bringing the regions determined to be in most danger up to safer standards - costing an estimated $92 million for this first year alone.

== NSP Background ==
In 2001, after gaining power, Ashraf Ghani had envisioned the creation of several national development projects which would create public trust in governance. These programs included a National Emergency Employment Program to provide jobs across the country, a National Health and Education Program to get basic health packages to citizens and get children back in school, a National Transportation Program to make Afghanistan a land bridge for South and Central Asia and the Gulf, a National Telecommunications Program to set up a cell phone network across the country and attract private investment and a National Accountability Program to build good financial management (Ghani and Lockart, 2008). The NSP is inspired by the Kecamatan Development Program, a community-based program started in Indonesia by Scott Guggenheim of the World Bank in the late 1990s.

After the Taliban were ousted from power in Afghanistan, the transitional power also realized that for the people to support the state, the most crucial national development project had to be visible to the 80% of the population in the rural areas. In order to interact with these people, engage them in development, include them in the reconstruction process and provide a uniform approach across Afghanistan, the National Solidarity Program (NSP) was launched.

As one of the Afghan government's National Priority Programs the NSP has been publicized as one of the most successful CDD programmes in the world to date. As a large scale rural reconstruction and development programme, the NSP had two primary goals: to strengthen local governance to foster rule of law and to lay the foundations of community managed sub-projects comprising reconstruction and development. The reconstruction efforts would be aimed at improving access of rural communities to social and productive infrastructure and services. Launched in 2003, the program was instrumental in generating employment and initiating the rehabilitation of rural infrastructure devastated by severe drought and two decades of conflict. The president of the World Bank estimates the economic rate of return on the NSP to be almost 20 percent (Zoellick, 2008). The NSP is funded by the International Development Association at the World Bank and the Afghanistan Reconstruction Trust Fund. Implemented by the Ministry of Rural Rehabilitation and Development (MRRD) and funded by the World Bank, the UK Department for International Development (DFID), the Danish International Development and Assistance Agency (DANIDA), the Canadian International Development Agency (CIDA) and the US Agency for International Development (USAID), the NSP is the Afghan government's flagship programme. Acting as the oversight consultants and responsible for strengthening local capacity and programme management at the ministry were the consulting firms GIZ and DAI.

== Implementing the NSP ==
NGOs act as facilitating partners contracted by the MRRD to initiate the NSP and provide technical and capacity building support to the communities. The MRRD has developed an operational manual and facilitating partners that are contracted utilize it for community implementation. The facilitating partners serve many different roles in NSP implementations including training social community organizers tasked with educating the community about NSP, engaging community facilitators, providing technical assistance in designing and building infrastructure, providing election experts to implement CDC elections and assisting with the monitoring and evaluation of projects.

An NSP project cycle for a community is broken down into 5 steps and usually takes 2 years to complete. First the NSP facilitating partner is assigned to the province by contracting through the MRRD. The facilitating partner then contacts the community to inform them of the NSP and commence the community mobilization process. In the second step, the facilitating partner is responsible for initiating a fair and transparent election process to elect members of the locally governing community development council (CDC). The CDCs are elected through a process of identifying the eligible voters in a community, creating a cluster of approximately 25 families and ensuring at least 80% of the cluster votes for representatives. The elected CDC members then decide on the CDC president, deputy, secretary and treasurer. Thirdly, the newly elected CDCs consult directly with members of the community to reach a consensus list of subproject ideas. This list called the community development plan (CDP) comprises projects which can be carried out with funds from the NSP and independent of outside support. The subprojects which require NSP funding are then submitted by the CDC to the MRRD and the Oversight Consultant in a proposal. The facilitating partner is responsible for training the CDC members in project proposal writing, accounting and procurement. In the fourth step, if the proposal is approved, NSP block grants are disbursed to cover the purchase of materials. Arriving in installments the funds are also used for subproject implementation. The CDC continues to report to MRRD and to the community about the project's implementation process and budget. Lastly, the facilitating partners and CDCs undertake an evaluation of the technical quality of completed subprojects and documents the lessons learned.

== NSP Expansion ==
Since there is no formal census data available about Afghanistan it is hard to accurately identify the number of villages. Previously, it was estimated that approximately 20000 rural settlements or villages existed, however this was markedly increased to 42000 villages. Since field coordinators have reported that several of the villages comprise less than the minimum of 25 families required to initiate a CDC, it is estimated by the MRRD that around 28500 NSP communities would be a reasonable equivalent to rural settlements estimate. This approximation thus average 1 NSP community = 1.474 rural settlements. However the current average used is 1 NSP community = 1.583 rural settlements. (National Solidarity Program Website, 2010).

Once fully implemented the MRRD expects to reach all the communities across Afghanistan through the NSP. The NSP community expansion across Afghanistan has been divided into several phases. In Phase 1 which commenced in May 2003, 3 districts in each province were targeted in the first year reaching 6000 communities. In the second year this target was expanded reaching 4500 more communities which translated into half of Afghanistan being included in the program. In 2005 or the third year of the NSP an additional 6000 communities were targeted. The NSP Phase 1 concluded in March 2007 reaching approximately 17300 communities. In Phase 2 which ran from April 2007 until March 2010 the World Bank proposed covering an additional 4300 new communities bringing the total to 21600. This coverage meant that approximately 80-90% of Afghanistan had CDCs. On June 27, 2010, the World Bank announced that it had approved a US$40 million grant to support Phase 3 of the NSP. The third phase will build on the achievements of the first two phases of the NSP and complete the expansion of CDCs to all the rural communities in Afghanistan. In Phase 3, the Afghan government has introduced several innovations to institute the CDCs as lasting sustainable bodies of local governance. The expansion will also support the disbursement of block grants to the remaining 10320 communities for full NSP coverage across Afghanistan. In addition, to supporting the initial development needs, a second round of grants will be provided to 17,400 CDCs that have successfully used their initial grant. Most importantly, NSP III will focus on improving the institutional quality, sustainability and governance of CDCs and enhance their ability to engage with other institutions.
