= Scott Guggenheim =

Scott Guggenheim is an American expert in international development and senior advisor to Afghan president Ashraf Ghani. He was formerly lead social scientist for East Asia and Pacific at the World Bank. He is also the senior social policy adviser for the AusAID-Indonesia Partnership Program.

== History ==
He was born in New York in 1955.

He began his career working for the government of Mexico in their Museum of Anthropology and later received a Ph.D. in Social Anthropology from Johns Hopkins University. While studying for his doctorate, he began working at the World Bank, where he focused on the negative impacts of large investment projects. He also worked in Colombia for a few years. After completed his PhD, he worked in Somalia on behalf of the World Bank to conduct an environmental assessment for their project of building a dam. He played a central role on the World Bank Environment Department's 1993-1994 "Resettlement Review Task Force," which for the first time documented and public disclosed how many families were officially expected to be "involuntarily resettled" by projects across the institution.

In 1994 he moved to Indonesia and began working in the social capital-working group of the World Bank. He added Indonesia to a three-country study; consisting of Indonesia, Burkina Faso, and Bolivia; which looked at social capital and development. In 1998 Guggenheim founded the Kecamatan Development Program, a $1.3 billion community development program covering 34,000 villages across Indonesia. Other projects include the National Emergency Solidarity and Employment project in Afghanistan, which was the first community development and emergency public works program in the country and the Empowerment of Female-Headed Household (PEKKA) program which supports advocacy and micro-finance for poor widows in conflict areas across Indonesia.

=== Afghan government role ===
He is senior advisor to former Afghan President Ashraf Ghani. The two men have been good friends since they met in New York in 1981. Guggenheim has been described as "Ghani's brain". During a protest in Kabul on June 2, 2017, posters appeared with his face and text in Dari that read Ghani ba ehsara-e en shakhs meraqsad, “Ghani dances on the order of this man.” It is said that "his imprimatur is on many major government policies that have come out of the Gul Khanna."

== Personal life ==
He is married to Indonesian human rights activist Kamala Chandrakirana. He is fluent in Spanish and Indonesian.
