= United Nations Office for Disaster Risk Reduction =

United Nations organization

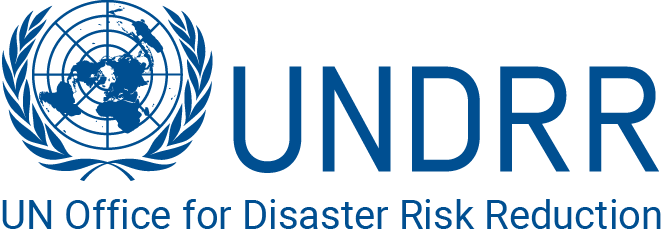
- UNDRR logo
- Abbreviation: UNDRR
- Formation: 22 December 1999; 26 years ago
- Type: Secretariat office
- Legal status: Active
- Headquarters: Geneva, Switzerland
- Head: Kamal Kishore
- Parent organization: United Nations Secretariat
- Website: www.undrr.org

The United Nations Office for Disaster Risk Reduction (UNDRR) was created in December 1999 to ensure the implementation of the International Strategy for Disaster Reduction.

The UNDRR is part of the United Nations Secretariat and it supports the implementation and review of the Sendai Framework for Disaster Risk Reduction adopted by the third UN World Conference on Disaster Risk Reduction on 18 March 2015 in Sendai, Japan. The Sendai Framework is a 15-year voluntary people-centred approach to disaster risk reduction, succeeding the 2005–2015 framework.

UNDRR's vision is anchored on the four priorities for action set out in the Sendai Framework.

UNDRR is led by a United Nations Special Representative of the Secretary-General for Disaster Risk Reduction (SRSG) and has over 100 staff located in its headquarters in Geneva, Switzerland, 5 regional offices (Africa: Nairobi, the Americas: Panama City, Arab States: Cairo, Asia-Pacific: Bangkok and Europe: Brussels) and other field presences in Addis Ababa, Almaty, Bone, Incheon, Kobe, New York-UN Headquarters, Rio de Janeiro and Suva.

UNDRR coordinates international efforts in disaster risk reduction (DRR) and it reports on the implementation of the Sendai Framework for Disaster Risk Reduction. It convenes the biennial Global Platform on Disaster Risk Reduction.

On 1 May 2019, the United Nations Office for Disaster Risk Reduction officially changed its acronym to UNDRR (from UNISDR) to better reflect its name. The former acronym had not been changed since the office was called the International Strategy for Disaster Risk Reduction.

== History ==
1989 International Decade for Natural Disaster Reduction

Given the increasing concern about the impact of disasters, the UN General Assembly declared 1990–1999 the International Decade for Natural Disaster Reduction (IDNDR). Initially, IDNDR was influenced largely by scientific and technical interest groups. However, the broader global awareness of the social and economic consequences of disasters caused by natural hazards developed as the decade progressed.

1994 First World Conference on Disaster Reduction and the Yokohama Strategy for a Safer World

The Yokohama Strategy for a Safer World: Guidelines for Natural Disaster Prevention, Preparedness and Mitigation and its Plan of Action was adopted at the World Conference on Natural Disaster Reduction, building on the mid-term review of the International Decade for Natural Disaster Reduction.

1999 International Strategy for Disaster Reduction (ISDR)

The International Strategy for Disaster Reduction (ISDR) was launched 3 by the Economic and Social Council and endorsed by the General Assembly as an international framework for responding to the challenge presented to the international community by the increasing incidence and scale of disasters. UNISDR was created as an inter-agency secretariat of ISDR together with the Inter-Agency Task Force on Disaster Reduction. The UNISDR mandate was then expanded to serve as a focal point within the United Nations System for the coordination of disaster reduction and to ensure synergies among the disaster reduction activities of the UN system and regional organizations and activities in socio-economic and humanitarian fields. Further mandates are to promote public awareness and commitment, to expand networks and partnerships, and to improve knowledge of disaster causes and options for risk reduction, building on the Yokohama Strategy and Plan of Action and as follow-up to the International Decade for Natural Disaster Reduction.

2002 The Johannesburg Plan of Action

The World Summit on Sustainable Development (WSSD) in Johannesburg, South Africa, noted that “an integrated, multi-hazard, inclusive approach to address vulnerability, risk assessment and disaster management, including prevention, mitigation, preparedness, response and recovery, is an essential element of a safer world in the twenty- first century.”4 The Johannesburg Plan of Implementation provided UNISDR and the Inter-Agency Task Force with a concrete set of objectives for integrating and mainstreaming risk reduction into development policies and processes.

2005 Second World Conference on Disaster Reduction and the Hyogo Framework for Action 2005–2015

The World Conference on Disaster Reduction was held in Kobe, Hyogo, Japan and adopted the "Hyogo Framework for Action 2005–2015: Building the Resilience of Nations and Communities to Disasters", which is currently serving as the guiding document in strengthening and building international cooperation to ensure that disaster risk reduction is used as a foundation for sound national and international development agendas.

2007 First session of the Global Platform on Disaster Reduction

The UN General Assembly established a biennial Global Platform on disaster risk reduction to support the implementation of the Hyogo Framework for Action, allowing government representatives, non-governmental organizations (NGOs), scientists, practitioners, private sector, IFIs and UN organizations to share experiences, identify remaining gaps, formulate strategic guidance and advice for the implementation of the HFA. Six Regional Platforms and over 80 National Platforms have also been established as multi-stakeholder forums.5 Regional Platforms also assess progress but focus on the details of the regional plans of implementation and National Platforms act as the national coordinating body for disaster risk reduction.

2011 Programme of Action for the Least Developed Countries for the Decade 2011–2020

The Istanbul Programme of Action (IPoA) charts out the international community’s vision and strategy for the sustainable development of LDCs for the next decade with a strong focus on developing their productive capacities. The Programme recognized that the scale and impact of natural disasters has increased over recent decades, threatening hard-won development gains of LDCs. It encourages LCDs to take action in implementing and integrating disaster risk reduction in their national and long-term planning and policies.

2012 United Nations Conference on Sustainable Development - Rio+20

The outcome Document - The Future We Want – of the United Nations Conference on Sustainable Development – Rio 20+ held in Rio de Janeiro, Brazil on 20–22 June 2012 contains a section (Chapter V-A) on disaster risk reduction that sets a firm foundation for discussions on a post-2015 framework to continue guiding nations after the Hyogo Framework expires in 2015.

2014 Third International Conference on Small Island Developing States and the SIDS ACCELERATED MODALITIES OF ACTION (S.A.M.O.A.) Pathway

The S.A.M.O.A. Pathway recognize that Small Island Developing States continue to grapple with the effects of disasters, some of which have increased in intensity and some of which have been exacerbated by climate change, which impede their progress towards sustainable development. It recognize that disasters can disproportionately affect small island developing States and that there is a critical need to build resilience, strengthen monitoring and prevention, reduce vulnerability, raise awareness and increase preparedness to respond to and recover from disasters.

2015 Third United Nations World Conference on Disaster Risk Reduction and the Sendai Framework for Disaster Risk Reduction 2015–2030

The Third United Nations World Conference on Disaster Risk Reduction was held in Sendai, Japan from 14 to 18 March 2015, drawing 6,500 delegates to the conference itself and 50,000 people to the associated Public Forum. The Conference adopted the Sendai Framework for Disaster Risk Reduction 2015–2030 (Sendai Framework) as the first major agreement of the Post-2015 Development Agenda, with seven global targets and four priorities for action.

The Sendai Framework for Disaster Risk Reduction 2015–2030 is the successor instrument to the Hyogo Framework for Action (HFA) 2005–2015: Building the Resilience of Nations and Communities to Disasters. The HFA was conceived to give further impetus to the global work under the International Framework for Action for the International Decade for Natural Disaster Reduction of 1989, and the Yokohama Strategy for a Safer World: Guidelines for Natural Disaster Prevention, Preparedness and Mitigation and its Plan of Action, adopted in 1994 and the International Strategy for Disaster Reduction of 1999.

It is a 15-year non-binding agreement which recognizes that the State has the primary role to reduce disaster risk but that responsibility should be shared with other stakeholders including local government, the private sector and other stakeholders. It aims for the following outcome:

"The substantial reduction of disaster risk and losses in lives, livelihoods and health and in the economic, physical, social, cultural and environmental assets of persons, businesses, communities and countries."

2017 Fifth session of the Global Platform on Disaster Reduction

The 2017 Global Platform for Disaster Risk Reduction, held in Cancun, Mexico on 22–26 May drew in more than 5000 participants, among which were policy makers and disaster risk managers. Thousands of governments, international organizations and civil society representatives were in attendance. It was the first time the forum was organized outside Geneva and the global progress in the implementation of the Sendai Framework for Disaster Risk Reduction adopted in Japan in 2015 was reviewed. During the forum, Nigerian climate change activist, Olumide Idowu, who was a member of the organizing committee and represented youth and children, was assigned to lead the social media team.

== Mandate ==
UNDRR's mandate has been defined by a number of United Nations General Assembly Resolutions, the most notable of which is "to serve as the focal point in the United Nations system for the coordination of disaster reduction and to ensure synergies among the disaster reduction activities of the United Nations system and regional organizations and activities in socio-economic and humanitarian fields".

Its core areas of work includes ensuring DRR is applied to climate change adaptation, increasing investments for DRR, building disaster-resilient cities, schools and hospitals, and strengthening the international system for DRR.

== Management ==
UNDRR is led by the Special Representative of the Secretary-General for Disaster Risk Reduction. Mami Mizutori took up office in this role on 1 March 2018, succeeding Robert Glasser of Australia. Prior to this, the organization was led by Margareta Wahlström of Sweden, who was the first Special Representative of the Secretary-General for Disaster Risk Reduction and had been appointed in November 2008. Robert Glasser took up his post in January 2016. From 1999 to 2008, UNDRR had been led by a UN Director-level official, under the auspices of the United Nations Office for the Coordination of Humanitarian Affairs.

The functions of the Special Representative of the Secretary-General for Disaster Risk Reduction include leading and overseeing UNDRR in the executions of its functions entrusted by the United Nations General Assembly, United Nations Economic and Social Council and the Hyogo Framework for Action (HFA) and its successor the Sendai Framework, as well as policy directions by the Secretary-General, overseeing the management of the Trust Fund for the International Strategy for Disaster Reduction, and carrying out high-level advocacy and resource mobilization activities for risk reduction and implementation. The Special Representative also ensures the strategic and operational coherence between disaster-reduction and humanitarian disaster preparedness and response activities, as well as socio-economic activities of the UN system and regional organizations.

== Risk knowledge ==
=== Global Assessment Report ===
The Global Assessment Report on Disaster Risk Reduction (GAR) is the United Nations' biennial global review and analysis of the natural hazards that are affecting humanity. The GAR monitors risk patterns and trends and progress in disaster risk reduction while providing strategic policy guidance to countries and the international community. The Report is produced in collaboration and consultation with a wide range of stakeholders, including various UN agencies, governments, academic and research institutions, donors and technical organizations and specialists.

The Global Assessment Report 2015 is titled "Making Development Sustainable: The Future of Disaster Risk Management" and reviews the disaster risk governance under the HFA and assess to what extent the expected outcome of the HFA has been achieved. The report can be accessed here Global Assessment Report 2015.

=== PreventionWeb ===
Launched in 2007, PreventionWeb provides a common online platform for institutions to connect, exchange experiences and share information about DRR. Readers can submit content to PreventionWeb, as well as syndicate PreventionWeb content to their own websites. The website is updated daily and contains DRR news, events, online discussions, contact directories, policy documents, reference documents, training and academic programmes, jobs, terminology, and country information, as well as audio and video content.

== Initiatives ==
=== Making Cities Resilient ===
The Making Cities Resilient: 'My City is getting ready!' campaign, launched in May 2010 initially for five years, addresses issues of local governance and urban risk while drawing upon previous UNDRR Campaigns on safer schools and hospitals, as well as on the sustainable urbanizations principles developed in the UN-Habitat World Urban Campaign 2009–2013. As of August 2015, over 2,600 municipalities and local governments participate in "The Making Cities Resilient: 'My City is getting ready!'" campaign.

Ten Essentials

The Making Cities Resilience campaign offers a Ten-point checklist to serve as a guide for local level action:

- Essential 1: Put in place organization and coordination to understand and reduce disaster risk, based on participation of citizen groups and civil society. Build local alliances. Ensure that all departments understand their role to disaster risk reduction and preparedness.
- Essential 2: Assign a budget for disaster risk reduction and provide incentives for homeowners, low-income families, communities, businesses and public sector to invest in reducing the risks they face.
- Essential 3: Maintain up-to-date data on hazards and vulnerabilities, prepare risk assessments and use these as the basis for urban development plans and decisions. Ensure that this information and the plans for your city's resilience are readily available to the public and fully discussed with them.
- Essential 4: Invest in and maintain critical infrastructure that reduces risk, such as flood drainage, adjusted where needed to cope with climate change.
- Essential 5: Assess the safety of all schools and health facilities and upgrade these as necessary.
- Essential 6: Apply and enforce realistic, risk compliant building regulations and land use planning principles. Identify safe land for low-income citizens and develop upgrading of informal settlements, wherever feasible.
- Essential 7: Ensure education programmes and training on disaster risk reduction are in place in schools and local communities.
- Essential 8: Protect ecosystems and natural buffers to mitigate floods, storm surges and other hazards to which your city may be vulnerable. Adapt to climate change by building on good risk reduction practices.
- Essential 9: Install early warning systems and emergency management capacities in your city and hold regular public preparedness drills.
- Essential 10: After any disaster, ensure that the needs of the survivors are placed at the centre of reconstruction with support for them and their community organizations to design and help implement responses, including rebuilding homes and livelihoods.

Role Model Cities

"Role Model Cities" are cities, municipalities or local governments that are participating in the Campaign and have demonstrated good practices and innovation in DRR and resilience.

Role Model Cities demonstrate achievements in at least five areas out of the 10 Essentials in the "Ten-point checklist of Essentials for Making Cities Resilient". The nominated cities or local governments must show innovation, sustained results in measuring and reducing disaster risk, their aims to continue to do so as well as must be interested to showcase and share experiences. They implemented innovative, creative, inclusive and efficient measures and action plans to realize strong political will in the field of DRR at local level. They inspire, share experience, create learning opportunities and provide support to other cities to boost their efforts towards committed resilient cities and communities.

=== International Day for Disaster Risk Reduction ===
The International Day for Disaster Risk Reduction (IDDRR) started in 1989 with the approval by the United Nations General Assembly. The UN General Assembly sees the IDDRR as a way to promote a global culture of disaster reduction, including disaster prevention, mitigation and preparedness. It encourages every citizen and government to take part in building more disaster resilient communities and nations. Originally celebrated on the second Wednesday of October, the UN General Assembly decided to designate October 13 as the date to celebrate the IDDRR.

The Step Up initiative started in 2011 and has focused on a different group of partners every year leading up to the Third United Nations World Conference for Disaster Reduction in 2015 - children and young People (2011), women and girls (2012), people living with disabilities (2013), the ageing population (2014), and traditional, indigenous and local knowledge (2015).

In 2016 the "Sendai Seven Campaign" was launched to encourage implementation of the Sendai Framework for Disaster Risk Reduction through IDDRR advocacy campaigns focused on each of the seven SFDRR targets. The Sendai Seven Campaigns have focused on reducing mortality from natural and man-made hazards (2016, "Live to Tell"), reducing the number of people affected by disasters (2017, "Home Safe Home"), reducing economic losses due to disasters (2018), and reducing disaster damage to critical infrastructure and disruption of basic services (2019, "Build to Last").

=== UN Sasakawa Award ===
The United Nations Sasakawa Award for Disaster Reduction is awarded to an individual or institutions that have taken active efforts in reducing disaster risk in their communities and advocates for disaster risk reduction. Together with the World Health Organization Sasakawa Health Prize and the UN Environment Programme Sasakawa Environment Prize, the United Nations Sasakawa Award for Disaster Reduction is one of three prestigious prizes established in 1986 by founding Chairman of the Nippon Foundation, Ryōichi Sasakawa.

Past winners

| Year | Name/Institution | Country |
|---|---|---|
| 2019 | Dr. P. K. Mishra | India |
| 2017 | Municipality of Amadora, and the Organization for Development, Renovation, and Equipping Schools (DRES) | Portugal, Iran |
| 2015 | Dr. Allan Lavell | United Kingdom/Costa Rica |
| 2013 | Belo Horizonte and National Alliance for Risk Reduction and Response Initiative | Brazil, Bangladesh |
| 2011 | Cities of San Francisco, Santa Fe and the District of North Vancouver | Philippines, Argentina, Canada |
| 2009 | Dr. Eko Teguh Paripurno | Indonesia |
| 2007 | Professor Yoshiaki Kawata and Mr. Tony Gibbs | Japan, Grenada and Barbados |
| 2005 | Mr. Chimeddorj Batchulluun | Mongolia |
| 2004 | Dr. Omar Dario Cardona | Colombia |
| 2003 | Mrs. Tadzong, née Esther Anwi Mofor | Cameroon |
| 2002 | Dr. Serguei Balassanian | Armenia |
| 2001 | Global Fire Monitoring Center (GFMC) | Germany |
| 2000 | Fondo para la Reconstrucción y el Desarrollo Social del Eje Cafetero (FOREC) | Colombia |
| and ... 1993 | Professor Oladapo Alabi Ladipo and Mrs Grace Ebun Delano (Nigeria) and the Arpana Research and Charities Trust (India) | Nigeria and India |

=== ARISE ===
The UNDRR Private Sector Alliance for Disaster Resilient Societies, known for short as ARISE, builds on and integrates the work of the UNDRR Private Sector Partnership and the R!SE Initiative to support the implementation of the Sendai Framework for Disaster Risk Reduction. The overall goal of ARISE, which was launched in November 2015, is to create risk-resilient societies by energizing the private sector in collaboration with the public sector and other stakeholders to deliver on the targets of the Sendai Framework for Disaster Risk Reduction. ARISE will expand the number of private sector organizations and others involved in supporting the implementation and allow the private sector to implement tangible projects and initiatives that deliver results critical to the achievement of the outcomes and goals of the Sendai Framework for Disaster Risk Reduction. ARISE facilitates exchange of experience and knowledge on how to implement tangible disaster risk reduction projects through seven work-streams: Disaster Risk Management strategies, investment metrics, benchmarking and standards, education and training, legal and regulatory, urban risk reduction & resilience, and insurance.

== See also ==
- Disaster risk reduction
- Climate change adaptation
- Emergency management
- Natural disasters
- Vulnerability
- Business continuity planning
- Climate change
- Risk management
- Building Back Better
