= Margareta Wahlström =

Swedish disaster relief expert

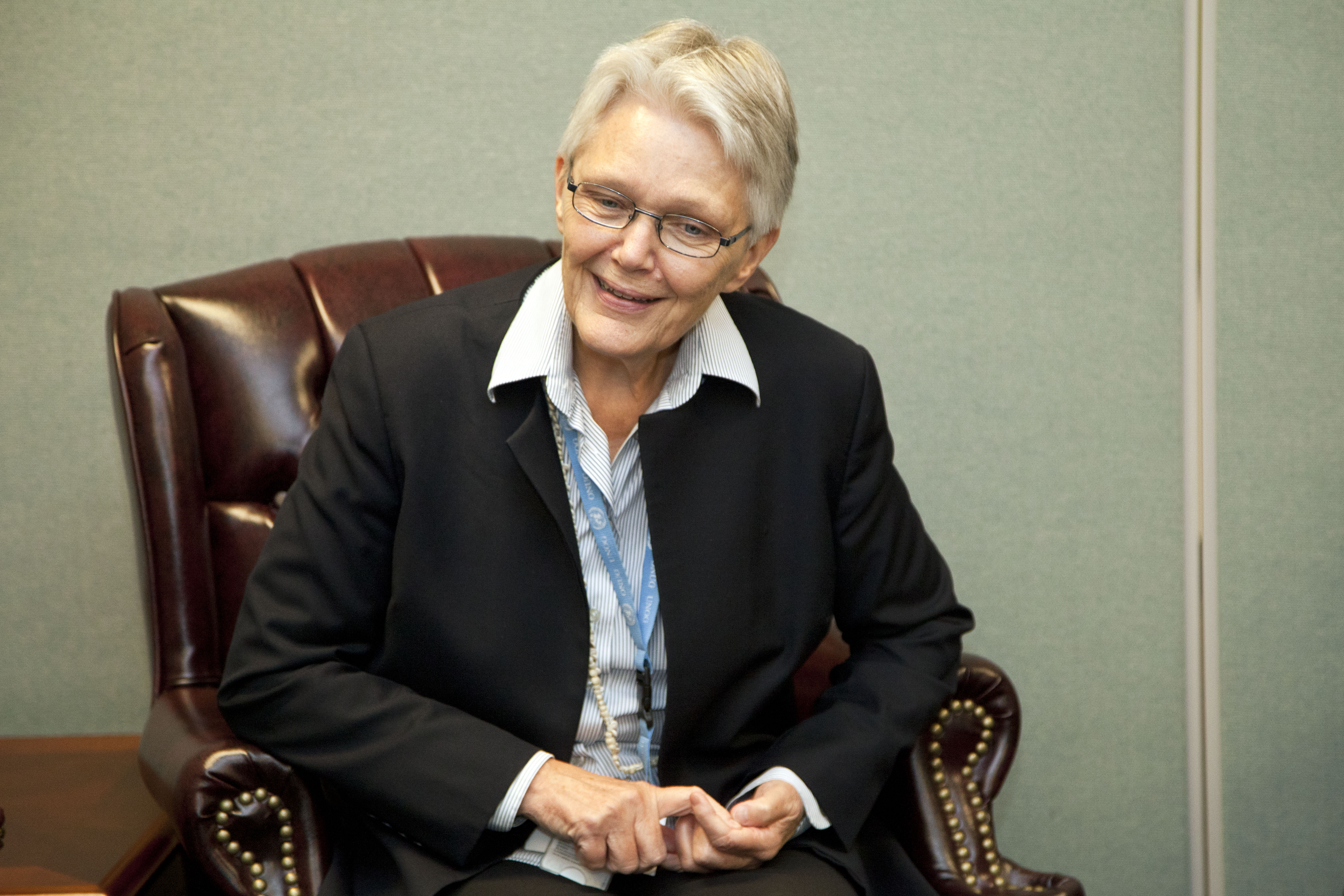
Margareta Wahlström (2013)

Margareta Wahlström (born 30 March 1950) is a Swedish diplomat and social scientist who has held leading positions in the Red Cross and the United Nations. Specializing in disaster relief, from 2008 to 2015 she served as UN Assistant Secretary-General for Disaster Risk Reduction, simultaneously heading the United Nations Office for Disaster Risk Reduction. In May 2017, she was elected President of the Swedish Red Cross.

== Biography ==
Born on 30 March 1950, Margareta Wahlström was brought up in Boden in north-eastern Sweden. The first in her family to go to university, she studied diplomacy, economic history and social anthropology, as well as French and Spanish, at Stockholm University. Wahlström's first job after graduating was in South America where she worked on a development project. She was then invited to go to Vietnam to take part in an aid initiative involving a paper mill. It provided opportunities for her to meet many inhabitants interested in rebuilding their country. The experience inspired her to devote her life to assisting people struck by major disasters.

After Vietnam, she moved to neighbouring Cambodia where she joined the refugee organization UNHCR where she was charged with investigating security. After a short assignment in Thailand she returned to Stockholm where she embarked on a doctoral thesis on rural development. Unable to spend all her time in the university library, she soon took up a new post with the Swedish Red Cross as an administrator in South Africa during the final years of apartheid. In 1989, this led to a position with the International Red Cross in Geneva as Desk Officer for Southern Africa with assignments in Angola and Cambodia. She was then promoted to deputy director of Operations (1991) and finally to Under Secretary-General (1995–2000). These positions involved cooperation with national Red Cross bodies in disaster-ravaged countries including the Congo, Somalia, Iraq and the emerging countries of the former Yugoslavia.

Once again preferring to work in the field rather than in a desk job, Wahlström moved to Afghanistan on a UN assignment aimed at reconstructing the country as part of its disaster recovery agenda. In 2009, she was appointed Special Representative of the United Nations’ Secretary General for Disaster Risk Reduction, and simultaneously Head of the United Nations’ Office for Disaster Risk Reduction (UNDRR). In 2015, under her leadership the UN adopted the Sendai Framework for Disaster Risk Reduction.

In 2017, now aged 67, Wahlström accepted an invitation from the Swedish Red Cross to become their new leader. She accepted, taking up her new appointment on 7 May 2017.
