= Hadhrami music =

Hadhrami music is one of the five main Yemeni musical genres or "colours" (Arabic: الوان, romanized: alawn). It is native to the Hadhramaut region of Yemen and it is regarded as one of the most prominent forms of Arabic music. Its unique maqamat are widely employed by composers and musicians throughout the Arabian Peninsula. It compasses vocal performances in the Hadhrami Arabic dialect and features melodic phrases and a characteristic humming-style known as the Dan.

== History ==
The tradition of Hadhrami song began to take shape in the mid-19th century. Early pioneers emerged among the Ba 'Alawi communities in Tarim, Seiyun, and Al-Hawtah, where local musicians first professionalised the art of singing and music. Notable figures during this period include Sayyid Omar bin Abdullah Al-Habashi and Ahmed bin Aidarous Al-Habashi, both of whom played pivotal roles in shaping the region's musical heritage.

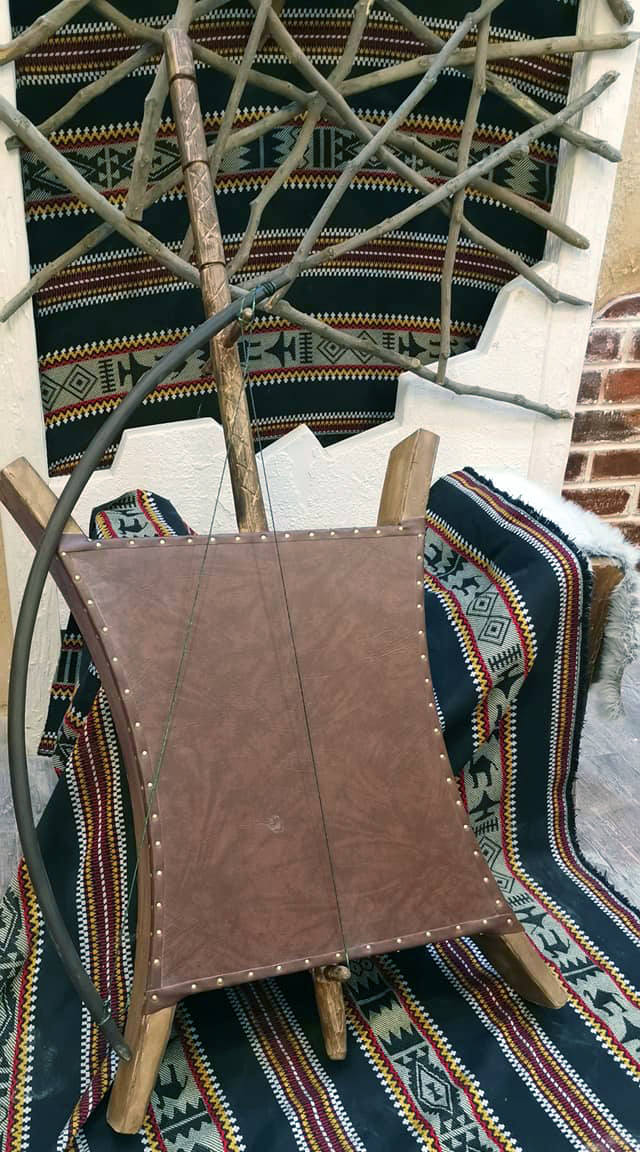
Yemeni rebab

In Tarim, Sayyed Abdul Qadir bin Hassan Al-Kaf—popularly known as Saeed—became one of the earliest and most esteemed artists of Hadhramaut. Renowned for his voice, intricate melodies, and mastery of traditional instruments such as the oud and the rebab.

The origins of Hadhrami music are said to be deeply rooted in ancient traditions, with its origins tracing back thousands of years to the Aad tribe of southern Arabia, with early myths recounting the legend of Jaradatay Aad—a duo of legendary female singers reputed to be among the first to perform in the Hadhramaut region.

Hadhrami musical styles are markedly distinct from those of northern Yemen. According to the ethnomusicologist Jean Lambert, the Hadhrami Dan was virtually unknown in Sana'a until the late 1980s, despite the presence of a significant number of political refugees from Hadhramaut in Sana’a. Lambert argues that this phenomenon reflects a longstanding lack of political and cultural integration between Hadhramaut and the rest of Yemen, even though the region is part of the broader Yemeni cultural sphere.

Historically, Hadhramaut maintained extensive contacts with regions such as India, Indonesia, and the Arab states of the Persian Gulf. These interactions contributed to a distinctive musical identity that developed largely independently of northern Yemeni traditions. It was only after Yemen's unification that many Hadhramis began to more fully recognise a unified Yemeni identity and its attendant political responsibilities.

An illustrative example of Hadhramaut's cross-cultural exchange is the emergence of the "Indian style," in Yemeni music. In the 1920s and 1930s, Indian musical influences became prominent as numerous musical and theatre groups, as well as films, were introduced—especially in Aden, which had long been under the administration of the British Viceroy of India. By the 1940s and 1950s, Yemeni musicians had adapted these influences to create an "Arabized" Indian style, in which tunes from Indian films were reinterpreted with texts set in classical Arabic rather than colloquial language. The acclaimed artist Muhammad Juma Khan, known for his mastery of the Hadhrami style, became one of the foremost practitioners of this hybrid form with works such as "Jinn al-Zalam," based on a classic poem by the 13th-century Arab poet Baha al-Din Zuhair.

Similarly, the work of Ahmad Ubayd al-Qa’tabi—for instance, in his rendition of "Ya A’zaz al-Nas ‘andi" (another poem by Baha al-Din Zuhair)—further exemplifies the synthesis of Indian and indigenous Yemeni elements. Lambert also noted that this innovative musical approach influenced other artists, such as Khalil Muhammad Khalil, who described his style as "neither from the Gulf nor from Egypt."

This confluence of local traditions and foreign influences is also evident due to the region's strategic location along the ancient incense road. Indian and African musical elements have intermingled with indigenous forms over time. Consequently, Hadhrami singing is often categorised into two principal styles:

The valley (Wadi) style—typical of interior regions such as Tarim —features melodious, sometimes faster-paced Dan songs with a distinct, nomadic flavour.

The coastal (Sahel) style—more receptive to external influences—exhibits a broader array of imported musical forms.

A third, more austere desert (Sahra) style is also recognised, characterised by narrower melodic boundaries; this style is exemplified by performances like Hood Al-Aidarous's rendition of "Bint Al-Badia."

Hadhrami music has been deeply influenced by Sufism. Over the centuries, Sufi chanting in Hadhramaut has served as both a cultural melting pot and a creative incubator for local musical traditions. The proliferation of Sufi religious schools (rabat) helped to preserve and continuously develop this art form, which bears similarities to the Tihami chanting style. In many parts of Hadhramaut, annual festivals—coinciding with occasions such as the Islamic New Year, the Prophet's birthday, the mid-point of Shaʿban, and the Friday of Rajab—feature religious chanting and poetic recitations. Although some conservative segments of society have historically viewed music as contrary to religious principles, these celebrations have persisted as important expressions of communal heritage and artistic practice.

The region is renowned for its vast array of over four hundred distinct rhythmic patterns that vary by locality. These rhythms are closely tied to daily activities and special occasions—from planting and fishing to wedding celebrations. A key musical form in the region is al-Dan, a fixed melodic structure in which the melody precedes the lyrics; in contrast, in other songs the lyrics typically come before the melody.

== The Dan ==
A central component of Hadhrami musical heritage is the Dan, a unique form of folklore song native to the interior region (Wadi Hadhramout) that has also been embraced in coastal areas. The Dan encapsulates the emotional and social expression of Hadhrami society through its distinctive lyrical and musical style.

Regular Dan gatherings—social events where poets and composers improvise verses while enjoying a traditional tea known as "Bahari"—foster both poetic contests and collaborative creativity, resulting in the spontaneous creation of new melodies and lyrics that reflect themes of love, pride, and social or political commentary.

=== Origins ===
Shabwani music and dance

The linguistic origins of the term Dan are a matter of debate among scholars. One school of thought attributes the term to the sound of Dandanah (which is close to humming)—a low, indistinct speech—while another contends that it derives from the Arabic word al-danu, meaning "approaching.".

The Dan first emerged among camel herders, eventually becoming known as "Dan Al-Jammala" (Dan of camel herders). Over time, it spread into major urban centres, including Mukalla, Ash Shihr, Seiyun, Tarim, Shibam, Daw'an, Amd, and Sah.

In his paper Musical Techniques in Dan Melodies, researcher Tariq Bahashwan categorises the Dan as a form of traditional singing, distinct from both primitive and popular vocal styles. According to Bahashwan, the Dan is a highly structured musical form composed of melodic phrases that correspond directly to poetic sections. The performance begins with the invocation of the word Dan to establish the rhythmic metre, which allows poets to internalise the metre and subsequently improvise verses in a manner akin to a poetic debate. These improvised exchanges often address political, emotional, and social themes during dedicated sessions.

Although the exact date of the Dan's emergence is unknown, ancient poetic texts suggest that this form originated around the tenth century AD. They cite, as evidence, the colloquial verses of the poet Omar Abdullah Bamkhrama (died 1545), who frequently referenced dan sessions and employed the term "dan" and its derivatives in his works. Notable other poets associated with the Dan tradition include Haddad bin Hassan al-Kaf, and Hussein al-Muhdar. Among the renowned performers are Saeed Awad, Haddad al-Kaf, Karama Mursal, and Abu Bakr Salem Balfaqih. In particular, the duo of Abu Bakr Salem Balfaqih and poet Hussein Al-Mehdhar is widely recognised as one of the most influential partnerships in the modern history of Hadhrami Dan, and they are credited with disseminating the form beyond Hadhramaut and Yemen to other Arab countries.

While some observe similarities between Andalusian muwashshaḥ and the art of Dan, other researchers maintain that Dan is a uniquely Hadhrami tradition with no direct counterpart in Yemen or other Arab countries.

Some historians, such as Riyadh Basalama, argue that Andalusian Muwashahat is part of Hadhramaut's artistic heritage. They suggest that Hadhrami migrants carried this art form to Andalusia, where it evolved before being reintroduced to the region in the 12th century. Referencing Hadhrami poets—like Abu Bakr bin Abdullah bin Shihab—who adopted aspects of Andalusian Muwashahat in their work, while more widely available sources suggest that these forms actually originated from Yemen's San'ani genre.

=== Types and variants ===
The Habeesh dan and dance

Hadhrami Dan is not a monolithic tradition; it encompasses several distinct variants, with nomenclature that is often interchangeable and largely dependent on regional and scholarly classifications. The most prominent variant is Dan Ghayadi, named after Wadi Ghayadi and associated with Wadi Daw'an. This variant is commonly performed in the valleys of Hadhramaut extending to its western coast.

Another variant, Dan Al-Habish, is performed in the coastal areas between Ash Shihr and Al-Musaynaa. It is often described as having two sections, while some sources associate it with a single section, and it is noted for having a faster rhythm and movement than Al-Haiqi. Among the Bedouins, it is featured in both "Ash-Sharh" and the "Al-Habish" dance—known in the Hadhramaut desert. Al-Habish is also the name of a dance in which men and women gather together, clap, and form a circle while two or more dancers perform in the centre. This dance features various melodies, with each melody referred to as a sawt.

Dan Al-Shabwani is performed along the Hadhramaut coast—particularly from Ash Shihr, a region considered a likely origin of this variant.

Dan Al-Rayedh is a type distinguished by its slower rhythms and melodies and is popular in Seiyun and Tarim. Unlike other variants, it is performed without accompanying dance, featuring long sections—often quadrilateral, quintilateral, or more—that lend it a serene quality; hence, it is called "Riyadh" due to the calmness of its melodies and the deliberate pace of its performance. There is also a variant of Rayedh Dan specific to women's gatherings and dances, which incorporates the use of anklets.

Another type is known as Dan Al-Hayqi —"Al-Hayq" in the Hadhrami dialect means "coast." It was so named because it often originates among the people of Al-Hayq and then spreads to the inhabitants of the mountains and valleys in Hadhramaut. This variant flourishes in the eastern regions of the Hadhramaut coast, and is followed by another type known as Al-Nayyed, meaning Najd, referring to the inhabitants of the valleys and deserts. The Al-Hayqi Dan typically comprises two, three, or four fast-moving and sharply defined sections.

In summary, the internal Dan of the Hadhramaut Valley differs from the coastal Dan of the Hadhramaut Coast. According to Abdullah Bawazir, head of the Hadhramaut Foundation for Artistic Heritage, the Bedouin Dan is characterised by coastal Bedouin lyrics that are specific to certain geographies and tribes; consequently, it has not achieved the same renown as the Hadhrami Dan, whose poets are typically scholars or writers employing a more widely understood, intermediate dialect.

=== Influence on Gulf music ===
Abu Bakr Salem and Ahmed Fathi perform (Hadrami Arabic: غدر الليل, romanized: Ghadar al-Layl, lit. 'Night Has Come')

Numerous art critics note that the Hadhrami Dan has played a pivotal role in shaping vocal traditions throughout the Arab world, particularly within the Persian Gulf region. This distinctive musical form is regarded as a foundational element for many singing schools, with contemporary artists continuing to draw inspiration from its rich heritage and folkloric melodies.

The Hadhrami Dan has spread to the Persian Gulf region through the migration of Hadhrami musicians who settled in Arab countries in the Persian Gulf. Over time, local musicians integrated the Hadhrami Dan and other forms of the Dan and other Hadhrami musical forms into their own repertoires. However, it has been argued that many Hadhrami and Yemeni musical works have been appropriated by Gulf musicians without proper attribution to their original composers and poets. Some Yemenite authors have even described this phenomenon as the "plundering" of Yemenite melodies Gulf musicians. While these perceptions may be understandable in light of contemporary identity concerns—a point elaborated by Lambert in his paper The Yemeni Sources of Poetry and Music in the Sawt of the Gulf: The Role of the Aravian Diaspora in India—they should be contextualised within broader historical and cultural exchanges. Nevertheless, figures such as Abu Bakr Salem have been instrumental in reaffirming the Yemeni identity of the Dan, particularly during his work in Aden between 1956 and 1958. Later, within the dispora, including in Saudi Arabia, he contributed to shaping not only Hadhrami music but also broader Arabian music traditions.

Another factors behind the Hadhrami Dan's spread throughout the Persian Gulf states is the phonetic similarity between the Hadhrami dialect and the local dialects of the Gulf region, besides the genre's rich diversity in musical scales, rhythms, and tempos.

=== Dan session performance ===
In a typical dan session, once all participants have gathered, one of the singers initiates the performance by delivering a verse composed entirely of the word "dan" and its derivatives, following a well-established pattern and performed in a style reminiscent of a mawwal. Thereafter, a poet present in the gathering improvises a verse in the local colloquial dialect, adhering to the same metrical structure. The singer then renders this verse in the same melodic fashion as the initial dan verse. This call-and-response pattern continues, with additional poets contributing successive verses that conform to the established metre and rhyme scheme.

The dynamic nature of a dan session is heightened by the number of participating poets, which in turn increases the overall excitement. A fundamental rule in these sessions is the prohibition of repeating rhymes. Should a poet inadvertently repeat a rhyme, the mistake is promptly pointed out by the participants, and if the group feels that the available rhymes have been exhausted, they transition to a new rhyme—often signaled by the poet beginning his verse with the phrase "Kharj tha fasl wa al-thani" (خرج ذا فصل والثاني), meaning "this chapter came out and the second is..." or a similar expression.

=== Steps toward UNESCO World Heritage status ===
Many Yemeni and Hadrami researchers and specialists hope that the Hadrami Dan will be included on UNESCO Intangible Cultural Heritage—similar to the inclusion of Sana'ani genre since 2003—as this art form awaits global recognition. Cultural authorities in Yemen have already received initial approval from UNESCO to consider its inclusion.

The documentation process began in early 2019 and the file was submitted to UNESCO; however, it has not yet been voted on.

Some Hadrami and Yemeni southern poets and writers, including Abdullah Bawazir, have expressed concerns about this initiative. Bawazir fears that once the Hadrami Dan is designated as part of Yemen's heritage, it may be generically attributed to Yemen as a whole—thereby obscuring its distinct Hadrami identity. He noted that local media and Arab outlets often describe this art simply as "Yemeni," he argues that the art form should be recognised and referred to specifically as Hadrami heritage, preserving its unique identity—just as the origins of "Sana'ani" or "Tihami" genres are clearly identified—to preserve its unique identity rather than merging it into a broader Yemeni category.

== Social and cultural context ==
Music in Hadhramaut is deeply interwoven with daily life and social rituals. Singing and dancing are integral to community gatherings, not only as entertainment but also as a means of preserving cultural heritage. Unlike in some other regions of Yemen where musical pursuits may encounter significant opposition, Hadhrami society has traditionally been more supportive—even if families initially resisted when individuals from religious backgrounds, such as Abu Bakr Salem and Abdulrahman Al-Haddad, chose to pursue music. Women have also played a crucial role in the evolution of Hadhrami music; pioneers like Aisha Naseer (1901–1974) and Fatima Mansour al-Shatri (1926–2003) helped lay the groundwork for subsequent generations of female artists.

== Notable people ==
Hadhrami music has evolved over time through the contributions of influential musicians and poets. Abu Bakr Salem Belfkih (1932–2017), for example, modernised al-Dân songs by incorporating contemporary musical instruments, while poets such as Haddad al-Kaff (1910–1970) and Hussein al-Mihdhar (1932–2000) enriched the tradition with their lyrics. Additionally, Mohammed Juma Khan (1903–1963) is celebrated as a pioneer who blended his Punjabi musical influences with local traditions. His composition "Leh Ya Dunia" is often credited with transforming traditional Hadhrami singing into a classical Yemeni genre.

Moreover, several prominent non-Hadhrami Arab musicians have also embraced Hadhrami styles. These include Kuwaiti singer Abdallah Al Rowaished; Saudi singers Abdul Majeed Abdullah and Abdel Rab Idris, the latter of Hadhrami origin; as well as Emirati singers Ahlam and Hussain Al Jassmi.

== Influence ==
Hadhrami music has significantly influenced the cultural landscapes of regions beyond the Arabian Peninsula, notably in parts of Africa and East Asia. In Zanzibar, for example, Hadhrami emigrants left an enduring mark on local musical traditions. Ashur Khamis Said, who arrived in Zanzibar from Hadhramaut with his family in 1935 at the age of ten, became well integrated into the community. Fluent in Swahili and recognised as a leading exponent of Arabian musical styles, he identified three Arabic-origin music styles—Sambra, Sharaha, and Shabwani—that continue to be performed in Zanzibar today.

In East Asia, the Hadhrami influence is evident in the integration of music into Islamic religious practices. In Singapore, for instance, there has long been a close association between music and worship—particularly within the Sufi tradition. The zafin, a devotional music and dance form originating in Hadhramaut and closely associated with the Arabic lute, uniquely blends elements of worship and entertainment. Moreover, many Hadhrami families in Singapore traditionally sent their sons back to Hadhramaut for cultural training. This practice not only reinforced their Hadhrami identity and helped preserve the language and musical heritage but also led to the incorporation of certain Malay linguistic features into Hadhrami Arabic.

In Indonesia, the encounter between Hadhrami and local cultures has given rise to a hybrid musical tradition. In Semarang, for example, elements of Javanese culture have blended with Hadhrami heritage, creating a unique, syncretic cultural expression. Similarly, in the region of Osing, Hadhrami emigrants have notably influenced local religious and musical practices. Researchers have observed that music in these communities functions as a medium for Islamic dawah and acculturation. Instruments such as the gambus, alongside performances of salawāt and hadrah, are used to commemorate religious events such as the Prophet's mawlid, marriages, circumcision ceremonies, and other significant occasions.

Hadhrami musical influence is also evident in Hyderabad. During the period from 1724 to 1948, Hadhrami migrants were recruited to serve in the armies, and they brought with them their cultural traditions—including distinctive musical styles—that have since contributed to the region's local heritage.

== Modern developments ==
Following the unification of North Yemen and South Yemen in 1990, the musical landscape of Hadhramaut underwent significant changes. Institutional support—once provided by organisations such as Mukalla’s Music Institute and various state-sponsored programs—diminished, and the region's urban soundscape shifted towards the noises of modern life and, more recently, the effects of conflict. Despite these challenges, the enduring appeal of Hadhrami music continues to inspire efforts among younger generations to revive and reinterpret its traditional forms, ensuring that this rich musical heritage remains a vital part of Culture of Yemen's cultural identity.

== Instruments ==
The instruments used in Hadhrami music vary widely, encompassing percussion instruments, string instruments, wind instruments, and simple clapping techniques, often used individually or in combination.

Archaeological evidence—found in ancient South Arabian sculptures (including gravestones and inscriptions in Marib)—documents the presence of musical instruments in the region since ancient times. Numerous inscriptions and images depict instruments such as the Simsimiyya, which appears in these ancient works and known as the 'Tanboor'.

While historical records indicate that instruments such as the qanbūs, Mizmar, madroof, and Rebab have been mentioned in Hadhramaut since before the mid-1800s.

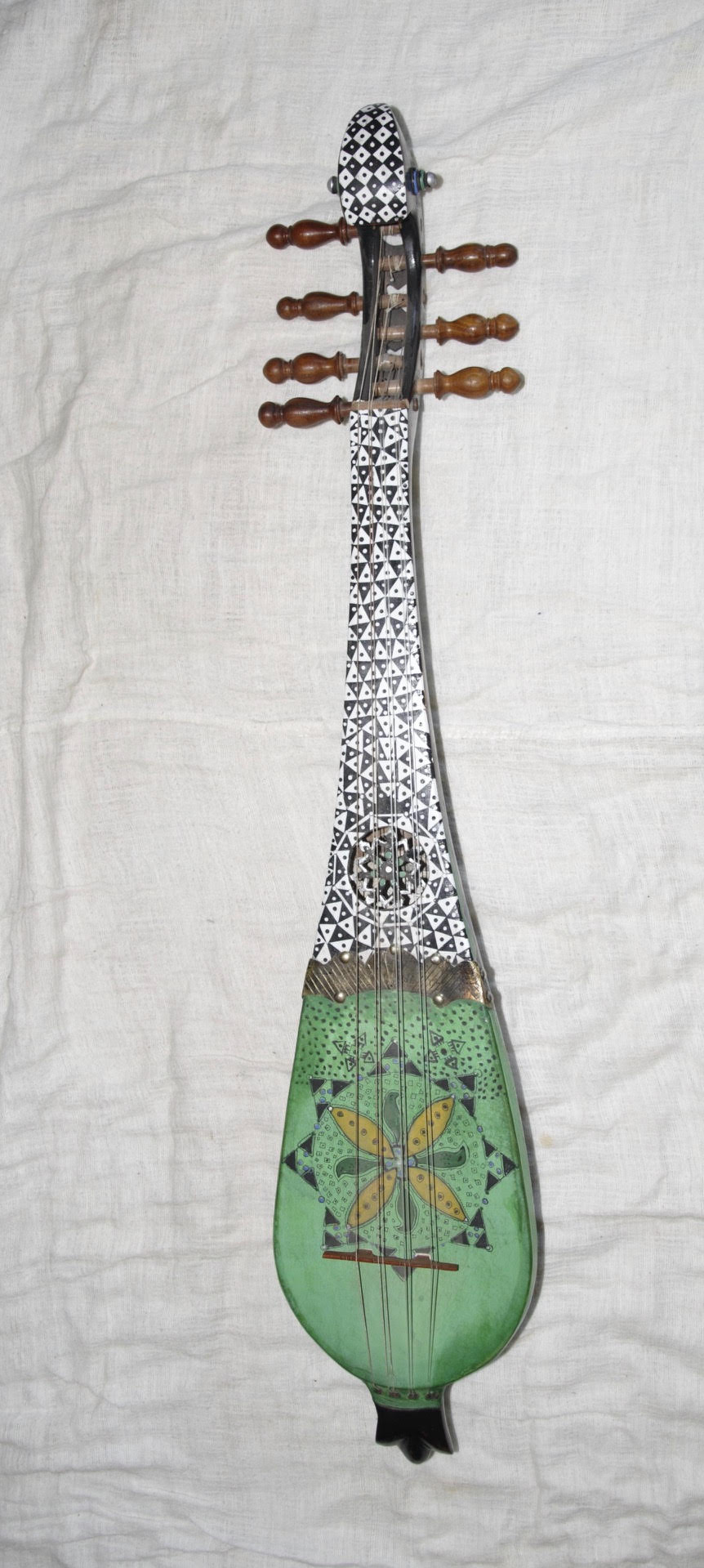
The Yemeni Qanbus

=== Qanbūs ===
A short-necked lute that originated in Yemen, the qanbūs is known as Qanbus among Hadhrami communities. In northern Yemen (especially Sana'a), it is referred to as Turbi, while in Oman it is known as Gabbus.

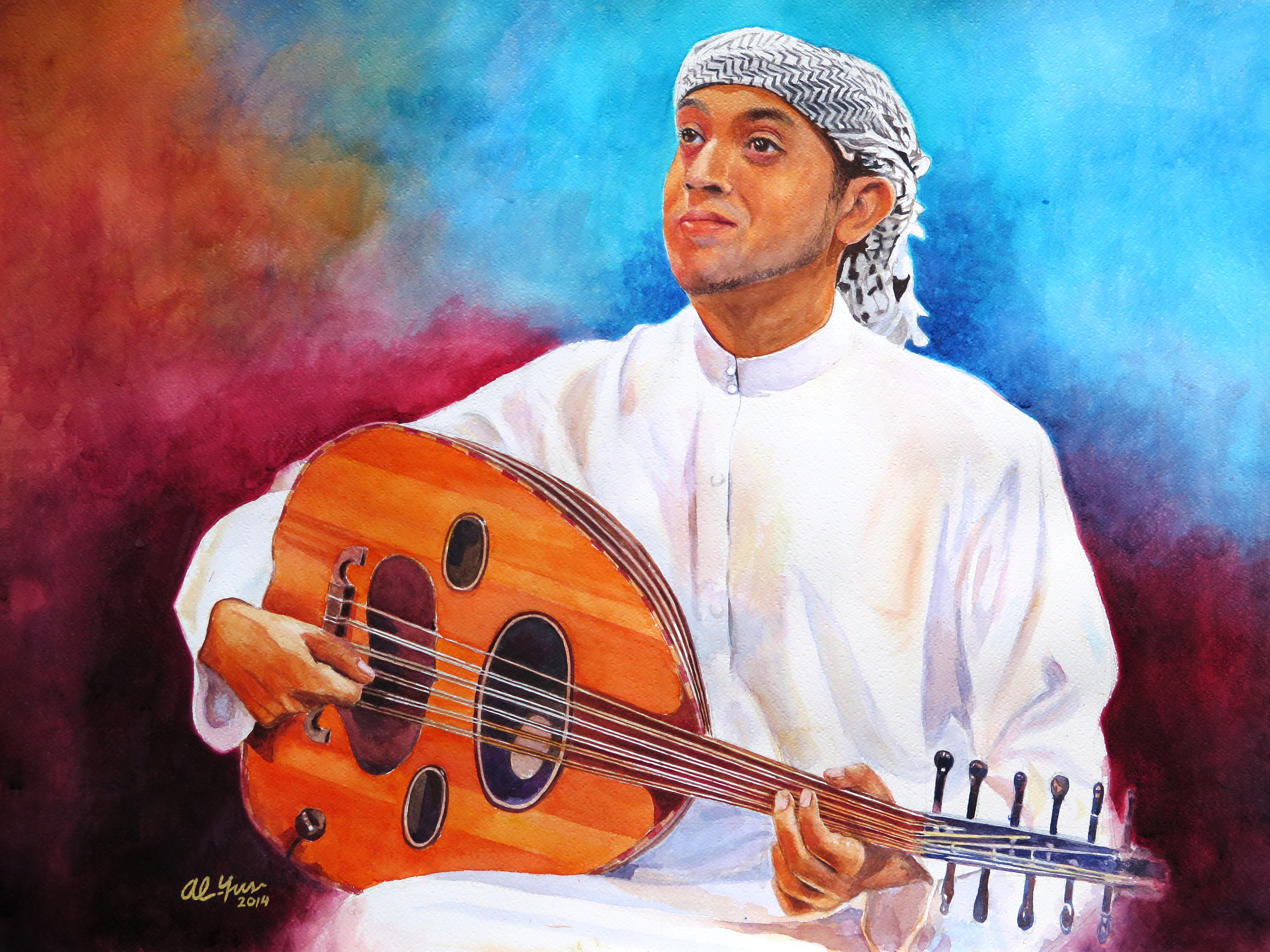
A musician playing Qambus Hadhramout (a type in Malay world)

Migration from Hadhramaut spread the instrument across the Indian Ocean. In Muslim Southeast Asia (notably in Indonesia, Malaysia, and Brunei), the qanbūs evolved which later gave rise to an entire musical genre. Today, the gambus is central to traditional dances such as Zapin and other genres like the Malay ghazal and ensemble performances known as kumpulan gambus ("gambus group").

In the Malay world there are two types of gambus: the gambus Melayu and the gambus Hadhramaut. "Gambus" can be used to refer simply to either type of instrument. The gambus Hadhramaut in Malay world likely developed in the 19th century after the arrival of the oud.

=== Oud ===
The Qanbus was the sole lute-type instrument used by the Yemenis until the emergence of the modern oud in the 1940s. In Hadhramaut specifically, however, the oud is believed to have arrived at the end of the nineteenth century. Consequently, a musical style known as Al-Awaddi (an adjective derived from 'oud') emerged in Hadhramaut during that period.

=== Simsimiyya ===
Usually played as a solo instrument, the simsimiyya was traditionally used by Yemenis in Hadhramaut and Tihama for wedding songs, tribal gatherings, and sheikh councils, although it is rarely played nowadays.

=== Rebab ===
This instrument is primarily used by Bedouins to perform instrumental melodies; it is seldom featured in vocal performances.

=== Hajir and Mirwas ===
Two of the main drumming instruments in Hadhramaut. The mirwas is commonly played at concerts and weddings—particularly during the Bara’a dance—and is characterised by its ability to produce both thick and delicate sounds. It consists of a wooden piece covered with leather and includes scales that allow the drummer to control its notes seamlessly.

The hajir is larger (approximately 80 centimeters in diameter) and is designed to be carried on the shoulder with a leather belt. A drummer uses a round-headed stick on one side and a headless bamboo stick on the other to play the instrument. Both instruments are integral to musical ceremonies and group dances.

Notably, the hajir is believed to have been introduced to Hadhramaut (and Yemen as a whole) from India and Africa, while Hadhrami migrants later carried the mirwas to Muslim Southeast Asia (especially Indonesia, Malaysia, and Brunei), where it is used in Zapin and Gambus musical genres.

=== The Tar ===
The Tar has been used since ancient times, especially in performances praising the Prophet Mohammed in Hadhramaut.

Traditionally, a performer—a wanderer and script memoriser—would use the tar to convey political, cultural, and religious news through drumming.

=== Taṣfīq (hand-clapping), Maraqees and Darbuk ===
Hand-clapping is an essential element in many Hadhrami musical traditions. Sometimes, hand clapping is replaced or reinforced by Maraqees—small, rectangular, hand-sized wooden sticks that enhance the percussive effect. They are usually accompanied by Darbuk, a thicker instrument fulfils a similar rhythmic role, contributing a deeper tone when used alongside the maraqees.

=== Ney, Mizmar and Madroof ===
These instruments depend on blowing for sound production and share similarities in performance style, though they differ in shape and tone.

The mizmar typically consists of two reeds with five finger holes, while the madroof is built around a single reed with seven holes. Both are still played at weddings and social gatherings in parts of Hadhramaut.

== See also ==
- Culture of Yemen
- Music of Yemen
- Abu Baker Salem
