= Yemeni hip-hop =

Music genre

Yemeni hip hop is a Yemeni music style and cultural movement related to rap and hip hop culture. It has influences from American hip hop and also from traditional music from the region. It is usually considered to have emerged from mid-2000s and reached its consolidation by 2009 when the first public concert was held in the French Cultural Institute. Although it has a variety of themes, there was an intense production of political songs by the Yemeni Revolution.

== History ==
=== Context ===
The Yemeni population is one of the poorest of the Arab world and is estimated to have a median age of 18 years. Around 60% of the population are under the age of 25. The Yemeni youth has constantly been related to issues regarding violence, unemployment, the controversial use of khat, participation in radical political groups, and other social problems. On the other hand, it has been a major actor in the latest political transformations and also on the development of a vivid hip hop scenery, facts that aren't coincidentally associated. The hip hop expressions often contemplates social-political issues and played an important role on the Yemeni Revolution. Thus, the dynamicity of the Yemeni youth has been both the spontaneous generator and the vessel of a large hip hop scene in the country, even though facing lack of institutional support.

=== Origins ===
The hip hop major outbreak in Yemen is often associated to the influence of the king of rap in Yemen Hagage "AJ" Masaed, an American-Yemeni rapper producing music since 1997. Although he had grown in the United States, AJ has successfully reached Yemeni audience by addressing to local issues and incorporating traditional musical language into his hits. This versatility was also one of the reasons he drew international recognition, since he entered in the Yemeni music scene, he has been partnering up with several Yemeni artists, such as Sammy Nash ( S19 ) Hussein Muhib, Fuad Al-Kibisi, Fuad Al-Sharjabi, Ibrahim Al-Taefi, Abdurahman Al-Akhfash and others, and helping new ones to develop their talents. He has also played a major role on propagating the understanding of rap as a means of change.

The second king of Rap in Yemen is Smokie Almo, aka YungYem, known by his American-Arabic Rap where he would mix Yemeni Arabic and American English in his songs. YungYem gained a huge popularity amongst Yemeni people mostly the youth.

One contributing factor to the development of the music is also the creation of Yemen Music House in 2007 that has been providing assets to the development of a contemporary music scene. In 2009, took place the first Yemeni Rap public festival, co-sponsored by the French and German foreign-missions. Due to the importance of this event, AJ draws a comparison between it and the fall of the Berlin Wall.

In 2018 a new Yemeni rapper Yemeknight emerged to the scene with his debut single called “Envision” which gained major popularity within western listeners and Yemeni immigrants in Europe and North America.

== Rap and the revolution ==
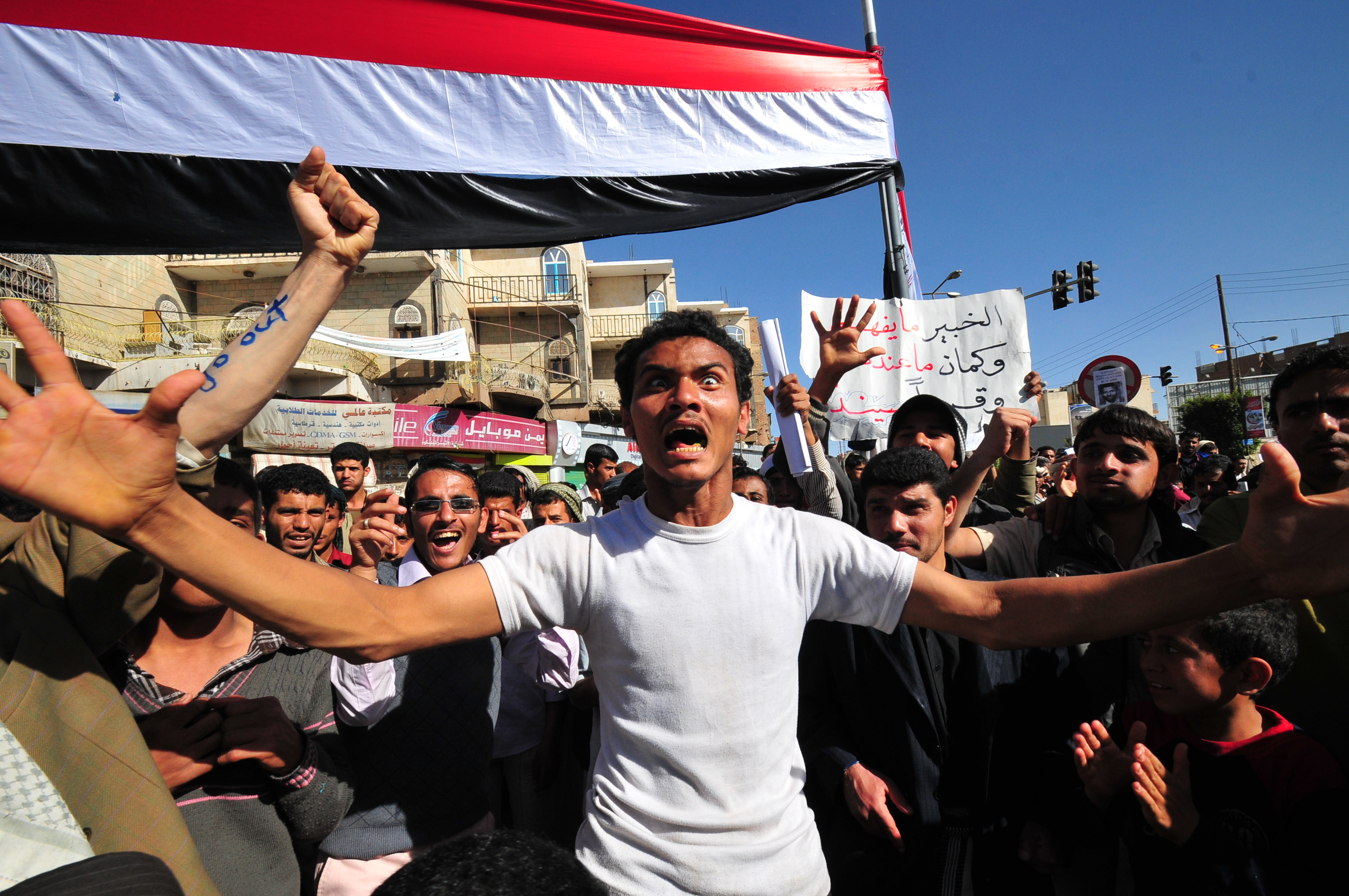
2011–2012 Yemeni revolution (from Al Jazeera) – 20110224

Since the Arab Revolutions have been mostly associated to youth movements, music have been thoroughly present in these processes. The Arabic rap music has been spread out and recognized by young Arab audiences. One recurrent example is the Tunisian rapper El Général. In the Yemeni case, one popular artist is Yemen's Monsters and Kawi, but there are and many other rappers that have been producing independently and publishing on social medias.

Most often, these songs are displayed on YouTube featuring images of the revolution, addressing a call for the Yemeni youth and singing "Erhal" (Arabic for "leave", that has been the slogan of street manifestations) to the former dictator Ali Abdullah Saleh.

Rap has been used to mobilize the youth as a language they can relate to, one example is the employment of this music style by the comedian Adre'i on a public manifestation, and that have also been spread as viral on the internet.

== Musical influences ==
Yemeni rap has strong roots on American rap, differing, for example, from what is made in the Maghreb that gets influences from French rap. AJ himself is American based, but he also mentions 2Pac as an influence on local rap enthusiasts. Besides that, artists such as AJ mixes with traditional Yemeni music and even incorporates local instruments on their productions.

The American influence is also evident when many artists choose to mix Arabic language with English language on their lyrics. Examples are the young and still independent artists such as Smokie Almo aka YungYem, Monika and Nadir Mohammed Haidar, and also Nadeem "Yung Sheikh" Al-Eryani, who has already made appearances on CNN and Al-Hurra televisions. There's also a Yemeni-Polish rap group PSW, which use both Polish and Arabic language in their songs focusing strictly on politics.

Traditional Yemeni music of the Jewish community is world widely recognized and has also been influence for foreigner artists of Yemeni origins, such as Diwon an American Jewish DJ that mixes hip hop, afro beat and Arabic music.

== Hip hop culture ==
As Hip Hop is most usually known to be an entire cultural movement that is not restricted to rap music, it has been also developing in Yemen by its other expression, such as breakdancing, as portrayed on the documentary Shake The Dust and considered to be an alternative activity for Yemeni youth rather than other social activities such as 'yukhazan', the social practice of consuming khat.

Street art and graffiti have also been actively emerging after the revolution as a political tool. One example is the artist Mohamed Al-Ansi that has been living on Change Square and feeding mobilization with his art

== Artists ==
- MIG
- Hagage "AJ" Masaed
- YungYem aka Smokie Almo
- YemeKnight
- DeALi "Blackmamba" Dmarrymusic
- MC Kenan
- Kawi, (كاوي)
- Wohoush Al Yemen, (وحوش اليمن), or Yemen's Monsters
- sonkey
- Amani Yahya
- PSW - Poeci Strefy Wojny (شعراء منطقة الحرب)
- ABMAN

== See also ==
- Arabic hip hop
- Algerian hip hop
- Moroccan hip hop
- Palestinian hip hop
- Yemeni music
- Hip Hop
