= Hagage "AJ" Masaed =

Hagage "AJ" Masaed or Hajaj Abdulqawi Masaed is an American-Yemeni rapper born in Ohio, considered to be the precursor of Yemen Hip Hop music.

== Life and career ==
From a family of poets, AJ started singing in 1978-1979, born in Youngstown, Ohio influenced by the New York scene. AJ's first time in Yemen was in 1981 after graduating from high school. He then decides to mix Arabic music with Hip Hop music, and in 1997 releases his first song 'Yemen', about the Yemeni traditions, values, superstitions, and shout out's to different cities and villages. In 1999, he released his first album 'Nights in Arabia' in San'a. The rapper moved to Yemen to care for his sick father in 2007 and has been living there ever since. After that, the rapper drew international attention, attending to major events. So far he has released seven albums.

== Work ==
AJ's music style is characterized by the mixing of genres. Very influenced by the American funk and Hip Hop as well as Jamaican (reggae), he established this hybrid style by adding the mizmar, an Arabic flute, to some of his first hits. This versatility was also one of the reasons he drew international recognition, since he entered in the Yemeni music scene, he has been partnering up with many American producers, such as Roddy Bo (Rodrick Saunders of Slaptop productions), Kennedy Lofton (Mood Set music), Roger Sims (of Rolor) to name a few, and several Yemeni artists, such as Hussein Muhib, Fuad Al-Kibisi, Fuad Al-Sharjabi, Ibrahim Al-Taefi, Abdurahman Al-Akhfash and others, and helping new ones to develop their talents. Also collaborating with international singer Jamaican artist Raskidus on several songs (on 4 of A.J.'s CD's), Somalian group S.O.Legend, and Tunisian singer MC Rai. He has also played a major role on propagating the understanding of rap as a means of change.

The rapper sings both in English and Arabic and on his lyrics, he often addresses to socio-political issues, like combating terrorism. In 2009, he participated in the first Yemeni Hip Hop Festival with the songs 'No Terrorists Please' and 'One Yemen United', he advocates social changing through rap music.

Since before the 2011 uprising in Yemen, Hagage runs a radio show on Shabab FM Radio mixing rap, hiphop and other new music styles from East and West. He also worked at Yemen FM radio introducing Yemen to Top 40 hits from around the globe.

== Discography ==
- 1999: Nights in Arabia
- 2003 The 2nd Coming
- 2005 Broken Dreams
- 2007:Worldwide
- 2010: Beladi
- 2014: The World, Words and Music

== See also ==
- Yemen Hip Hop
- Arabic hip hop
- Algerian hip hop
- Moroccan hip hop
- Palestinian hip hop
- El Général
