= Ahmed bin Ahmed Qasim =

Yemeni musician (1938–1993)

Ahmed bin Ahmed Qasim أحمد بن أحمد قاسم
- Also known as: The godfather of Adeni music
- Born: 11 March 1938; Aden Colony, (now Aden, Yemen)
- Origin: Aden, Yemen
- Died: 11 April 1993 (aged 55) Dhamar, Yemen
- Genres: Egyptian, Adeni, Yemeni
- Occupation: Musician
- Instrument: Oud
- Years active: 1928–1970s

Ahmed Bin Ahmed Qasim (Arabic: أحمد بن أحمد قاسم) (11 March 1938 – 1 April 1993) was a Yemeni musician, composer, singer, music teacher, conductor and actor. He is widely credited with modernising Adeni singing and promoting Yemeni music both locally and internationally. Qasim's innovative approach combined traditional Yemeni melodies with modern techniques and Western musical instruments, thereby establishing a new school of Adeni singing that has become a model for modernity in Yemeni music.

== Early life and education ==
Ahmed Qasim was born on 11 March 1938 in Aden and grew up as an orphan in a middle‐class family of three sons. Being the middle child, he was brought up in the famous Crater districts, in quarters such as Al-Qadhi, Hussain and Al-Quta’e. His upbringing in Crater is often cited as a major factor behind the speed with which he emerged as a distinguished genius in music and singing.

In his early years, Qasim demonstrated his natural musical ability by calling the adhan at the Banasir Mosque near his home. Recognising his gifted voice, his mother initially hoped he would become a Quran reciter and enrolled him with Sheikh Mohammed bin Salem Al-Baihani, a respected religious teacher in Aden, to study the Quran, its recitation, and memorisation. Although Sheikh Al-Baihani was impressed by Qasim's recitations using traditional maqamat, he also noticed the boy's strong passion for singing and advised his mother to let him follow his own musical path.

Qasim was further influenced by his surroundings, he drew inspiration from his mother's singing while she was hanging the laundry and from the humming of his brother playing a primitive wooden oud. These early experiences encouraged him to listen to the songs of prominent Egyptian musicians such as Mohammed Abdel Wahab and Farid al-Atrash, and he would imitate their tunes using a flute crafted from broken-necked bottles.

This period of exploration and self-expression coincided with his elementary studies and activities at the Bazara’a Charitable School during the British administration. There, under the tutelage of the renowned musician Yahya Makki—who led the school's music group—Qasim quickly rose to prominence, eventually becoming the group's maestro.

Under Makki's guidance, Qasim mastered playing the oud, which motivated him in 1954 to approach Aden Radio and record his first songs. Subsequently, he played a key role in establishing the Aden Music Symposium alongside friends such as Khalil Mohammed Khalil, Salem Ahmed Bamdhaf, Mohammed Saad Abdullah, Abu Bakr Fare’, and other pioneering singers in Aden. Additionally, he actively participated in the cultural and artistic dialogues of the period, an experience that had a significant impact on his musical development.

== Move to Egypt ==
In 1955, the renowned musician Farid al-Atrash visited Aden and, upon meeting Qasim, was struck by his remarkable voice and enthusiasm. Al-Atrash encouraged him to refine his talents through formal study in Egypt, it is believed that Al-Atrash helped Qasim secure a scholarship at the Higher Institute of Music in Cairo, which he obtained in 1956.

Even before his departure for Egypt, Qasim had recorded several songs for Sawt Al-Arab radio, and upon his arrival in Cairo his reputation grew further. While studying at the Teacher's Music and Art Education Institute in 1956–1957, he studied the Oud under Abdulrahman Al-Khateeb and Goma’ah Mohammed Ali. During this period, he was greatly influenced by the works of Mohammed Abdel Wahab and Riad Al Sunbati. Qasim also met the Yemeni poet Koor Saeed, for whom he recorded the song "Dakhalt Gannat Redhak" ("I Entered the Paradise of Your Happiness").

In 1956, Qasim recorded for Egyptian Radio and continued to have his songs broadcast on each visit to Egypt. His talent also found a place on the City Lights concerts in Egypt, where he was the first Yemeni singer to be widely appreciated by the Egyptian audience.

Qasim continued his studies at the Music High Institute, and in 1960–61 he was awarded a certificate as the best student on Teacher's Day. These formative years enabled him to develop a repertoire of Yemeni folklore songs, laying the foundation for his later contributions to modernising Yemeni music.

== Return to Aden ==
Upon returning to Aden in 1960, Qasim began teaching music in public schools and at the Teachers Training Centre until 1963. At the same time, he made significant strides in his musical career. In 1956, with the assistance of Yahya Makki, he opened a music class in Abyan to disseminate musical education. During the 1960s, he established the Ahmed Qassem Modernising Music Group—the first of its kind in Yemen—which became a launchpad for several Yemeni talents who later gained national prominence. Through this institution, Qasim reinterpreted Yemeni folk songs in a fresh, modern style while also introducing modern instruments such as the guitar and accordion to the traditional Adeni musical framework.

Qasim's early career was also marked by his initial strong attachment to the Egyptian musical model, a trend prevalent among his contemporaries in the Adeni Musical Symposium. He initially drew heavily from Egyptian songs. However, over time he came to appreciate the significance of Yemen's own musical heritage. His later works, such as the song "Yarit Aden" (I Wish Aden), reveal his gradual integration of traditional elements into his modernist approach. In this composition he applied a structural formula based on the theme and the couplet, composed a musical introduction distinct from the main melody, and crafted musical phrases with clarity and structural coherence—demonstrating a balance between innovation and heritage.

Qasim patriotic sentiments were vividly expressed through his compositions. Songs such as "Biladi" (My Country) and "Min Kulle Qalbi Ahebbic" (I Love You with All My Heart) resonated with the national sentiment, while his compositions "Ya’aibah" (A Shame) and "Sodfa" (By Chance) were widely regarded as his passport to Arab fame.

Qasim was known for his meticulous nature; he was never without his notebook, which he carried in his briefcase to record musical ideas and compositions that he hoped to publish during his lifetime. He is reputed to have often declared, "My life is not my own, it belongs to my Yemeni audience."

Qasim is also credited with launching Aden's first all-female singing group, which consisted of Sabah Mansour, Raja Basudan, and Umm Al-Khair Ajami, under the name Al-Thulathi Al-Latif (The Cute Trio). It is believed that he was influenced by the Egyptian band Al-Thulathi Al-Marah (The Fun Trio), whose emergence he observed during his studies in Cairo.

== My Love in Cairo (1965) film ==
Qasim's passion for cinema led him to explore the world of film. He produced and starred in the film My Love in Cairo (1965), co-produced with his friend Anwar Hamid. The film featured prominent Egyptian actors such as Mahmoud el-Meliguy, Tawfeeq Al-Deqn, and Zizi El-Badrawy, marking the first occasion a Yemeni actor appeared in an Egyptian film. In this film, Qasim performed ten songs in an effort to reconcile Yemeni and Egyptian lyrical and musical traditions. Although the film was not a complete failure, it did not achieve the desired financial success.

According to Abdullah AlMadani of the Okaz newspaper, Qasim's student, the renowned Yemeni singer Ahmed Fathi, recounted that in the late 1960s, Yemeni singers Mohammed Saad Abdullah and Mohammed Murshid Naji organised a concert in the city of Al Hudaydah in which Qasim also performed. This concert was the first to bring together these three influential figures, and Fathi noted that its purpose was to raise funds to cover the production costs of My Love in Cairo.

== Further studies and later career ==
Qasim's quest for musical mastery led him to further studies abroad. Between 1970 and 1973 he studied art and music science in Paris. He also sought additional knowledge in Hollywood, Moscow and London, broadening his exposure to Western musical techniques. Between 1980 and 1982 he studied under the renowned Russian musician Giovanni Mikhailov in Moscow, and between 1983 and 1984 he explored Music of the English and Western music in London.

Upon returning to Yemen, Qasim assumed several administrative roles. In 1986 he was appointed Financial and Administrative Director at the Ministry of Information, and from 1990 until his death he served as the Head of the Music Department in Aden.

== Scholarly studies and critical evaluation ==
A number of studies have been written about Ahmed Qasim, and his artistic doctrine has become a model for modernity in Yemeni music. Numerous lectures and seminars have been held on his history and art, and his work has been extensively analysed by researchers and cultural institutions. The Arab Fund for Arts and Culture (AFAC), in cooperation with the Future Partners for Development Foundation, even held a training course in musical arts using his work as a model for modernity in Aden and Yemen at large.

Among these scholarly endeavours, the artist and researcher Jaber Ali Ahmed prepared a lecture paper titled Yemeni Singing Experiences—which also featured the contributions of Prince Ahmed Fadhl al-Qumindan and Sheikh Jaber Ahmed Rizq. In his study, Jaber Ali Ahmed noted that Qasim's talent began to blossom during his time at Bazara’a School as part of Professor Yahya Makki's musical group. While Makki's influence initially steered Qasim towards a strong attachment to Egyptian musical models—a prevailing trend during the fifties—this modernist approach sometimes entailed a deliberate distancing from Yemen's popular and traditional musical heritage. For instance, Qasim's insistence on performing at wedding parties with his band in uniform, although not always popular with local audiences, was a clear indication of his desire to establish himself as a modern-style artist, bolstered by his great self-confidence and perseverance.

However, the critical reception of Qasim's work has also highlighted a complex relationship with the Yemeni musical heritage. Some scholars have argued that his renewal project, which was influenced by figures such as Khalil Muhammad Khalil, adopted a somewhat nihilistic stance towards the Yemeni traditional heritage. This approach, while enabling him to achieve a high degree of control over his artistic tools and to stand at the forefront of modernity, also deprived him of an important reference point that might have balanced his innovative efforts. Later in his career, as Qasim became increasingly aware of the significance of Yemen's musical heritage, he began to integrate elements of it into his work. An example of this is evident in the song "Yarit Aden" (I Wish Aden), where in addition to adhering to the Bedouin rhythm and capturing the essence of Yemeni singing, Qasim introduced several novel elements.

== Legacy ==
Ahmed Qasim is remembered as a seminal figure in modern Yemeni music. His pioneering work not only redefined Adeni singing but also paved the way for future generations of Yemeni musicians. His innovative techniques, which fused modern and traditional elements, earned him widespread acclaim from writers, poets, musicians and cultural intellectuals across the Arab region. Renowned figures such as the Yemeni prominent poet Abdullah al-Baradouni and music researcher Issam Khalidi have lauded Qasim for his ability to transform poetic lyrics into evocative songs.

This view by Al-Bardouni was cited in the obituary issued by the Ministry of Culture and Touriusm following Ahmed Qasim's death. In a documented conversation, the poet praised Qasim's ability to interact with a poem and transform it into a musical performance. He stated:

"I believe that the poems of Muhammad Saeed Jaradah and Nizar Qabbani, as composed by Ahmed Qasim, were adapted both in melody and performance so profoundly that they became entirely new works. The poems, when sung by Ahmed Qasim, are read as poetry but heard as something entirely different—sung rather than merely recited. This is the hallmark of a genuine singer: the ability to transform a poem into a distinct musical creation. Ahmed Qasim achieved this with remarkable success."

Beyond his musical achievements, Qasim's dedication to education and his efforts to modernise Yemeni music have left a lasting impact. His published and unpublished works—including the manuscript Music Rudiments and Theories, which remains with his sons—serve as a testament to his lifelong commitment to music. As Dr Abdulaziz Al-Maqaleh once noted in his weekly essay in Al-Thawra newspaper, Qasim's studies in Cairo, Russia and France had equipped him with the latest techniques, and his continuous quest for excellence remains an inspiration to young Yemeni talents.

== Death ==
Ahmed Bin Ahmed Qasim died in a traffic accident on 1 April 1993 near the city of Dhamar, while returning from Sanaa to Aden. His untimely death deeply shook the Yemeni artistic community and considered to mark the end of a rich era in Yemeni art.

As a tribute to his enduring influence, Egyptian radio broadcast a special programme dedicated to his life and works after his death.

== See also ==
- Music of Yemen
- Saber Bamatraf
