= Music of Yemen =

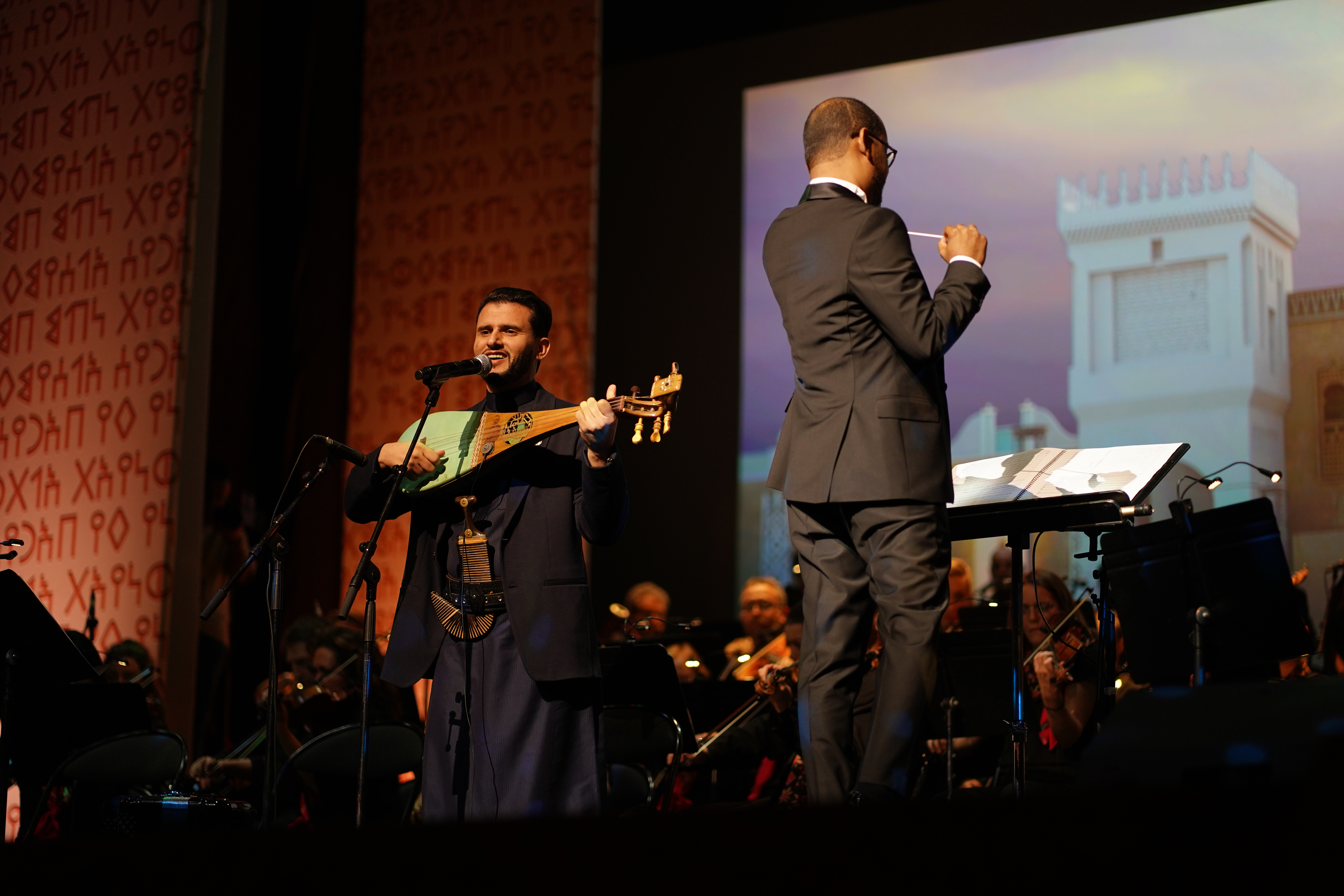
Hussain Moheb playing the Qanbus

Sanaani song by Hussein Moheb

Yemen, a country on the Arabian Peninsula, holds a prominent position in the realm of music, garnering recognition for its distinctive musical traditions. Revered as a cultural capital within the Arab world, Yemen has contributed significantly to the musical landscape of the region.

UNESCO proclaimed the tradition of poetic songs of Sanaa, called al-Ghina al-San'ani, a Masterpiece of the Oral and Intangible Heritage of Humanity. Yemenis commemorate 1 July as the Yemeni Song Day, an annual celebration that underscores the integral role of music in Yemeni society.

== History ==
=== Pre-history ===
Archaeological excavations have confirmed the antiquity of music in Yemen, demonstrating that it is a unique art form independent of influences from the ancient Near East. Yemeni music is deeply rooted in the region, widely disseminated, and influential among various cultures—even reaching the countries of the Far Maghreb.

Archaeological surveys and excavations—ranging from petroglyphs in regions such as Saada, Tihama, Sanaa (Bayen Jadrain), Haz, Al-Jawf, Marib, and Najran—to artefacts such as coins, statues, and inscriptions—have revealed that music in ancient Yemeni civilisations originated when early Yemenis employed a diverse array of musical instruments. For example, a French mission in the Saada region uncovered a rock drawing depicting the kinara instrument, dating back to prehistoric times. In the Al-Jawf region, columns at the Arn Yedda Temple feature scenes of musical instruments accompanied by dancers, representing wind instruments like the trumpet and the khushkhishah—a sound-producing instrument—with this artwork dated to the 9th–8th century BC. Additionally, a column at the Ma'in Temple displays scenes of musical processions that include stringed instruments such as the Tanbura, alongside wind instruments like the trumpet and flute, carried by groups of priests. Numerous other archaeological findings further attest to the rich diversity of wind, percussion, vocal, and stringed instruments in ancient Yemen.

The documentation of rock art has played a prominent role in shedding light on the musical arts of ancient Yemeni civilisation, beginning in the Paleolithic era. The widespread availability of rock surfaces provided an ideal canvas for recording daily life and activities visually. Al-Eidaroos contends that these rock drawings carry a mystical meaning associated with religious beliefs. For example, a painting from the area Bayen Jadrain, dating back to the Bronze Age, depicts dancing figures alongside animals. In addition to numerous rock drawings that also illustrate musical scenes featuring various instruments. Some images show musicians actively playing, while others merely depict the presence of instruments.

In a rock drawing from Al-Mastour Cave in the Tihama region—dating back to the Bronze Age—a group of figures is depicted performing a ritual dance traditionally held before hunting ceremonies. This type of dance appears abundantly at various sites, tracing its origins to prehistoric times. Similar scenes are also evident in rock art from the Hima region in Najran, where groups of figures are shown engaged in devotional dancing with raised hands. These images highlight significant cultural, religious, and social patterns among the region's ancient inhabitants. Notably, the rock painting represents a primitive depiction of human figures, rendered in a form of drawing style that is closely associated with religious symbolism that was commonly executed on rock surfaces.

In the Al-Baha region, a coloured drawing was found of a group of people dancing in a group, forming a single row, raising both hands and beating what resembles drums, and what their hands hold are drumsticks for beating the drums.

German scholar Holfritz, during his travels in Yemen, documented over a hundred distinct types of traditional Yemeni music. He attributed this diversity to two main factors: first, the unique cultural and environmental characteristics of the Bedouin tribes, and second, the varied geographical landscape of the region. Holfritz concluded that these factors combined to create a rich musical tradition in ancient Yemen that set it apart from the music prevalent in the cities of the Near East.

Holfritz reinforced his observations regarding the diversity of melodies and the transitions between different rhythmic degrees. Notably, he discovered a striking similarity between Yemeni musical melodies and the Berber music of North African tribes, particularly in Morocco. Furthermore, he traced the spread of these musical expressions to the West, suggesting that such melodic traditions had been transmitted since the Stone Age via South Arabian (Yemeni) and Berber cultural exchanges. Similarly, In the introduction to his book on the origins of music, Farmer underscores the pivotal role of the South Arabian kingdoms in the emergence and development of music, tracing its roots back to the early first millennium BC. He also references an inscription from the seventh century BC by the Assyrian king Ashurbanipal, which expresses admiration for Arab music—remarking that Arab captives spent their time singing and playing music while serving the Assyrian kings.

The Yemeni researcher, Widad Ahmed Qasim Al-Qadasi, argues that the ancient Yemeni migrations, which began at the start of the first millennium BC, played a crucial role in spreading the musical arts beyond Yemen. These migrations facilitated the transmission of Yemeni musical traditions to regions such as Morocco, where the influence was clearly evident in the Berber music movement—primarily through commercial caravan journeys. Moreover, historical sources recount legends from the pre-Islamic era that are linked to singing. The oldest of these is the legend of Jaradti ʿĀd," in which two female singers distracted the delegation of Ad from praying and seeking aid from the gods of Mecca through their song. This event is regarded as the origin of female singing.

This is corroborated by Abu Muhammad al-Hasan al-Hamdani in the eighth part of Al-Iklil, where he recounts an ancient cave containing the grave of Mansik bin Luqaim, the treasurer of Aad. In that cave, on the lower level, he describes "two great statues that God Almighty transformed into stones, fashioned in the likeness of two slave girls. One of the statues bears a transformed Artaba (ancient lute-type), while in its left hand it holds a transformed mizmar." Additionally, the use of the tanbur is attributed to the Sabaeans; as Huth noted—based on a manuscript in her possession—the Sabaeans were the first to adopt this instrument.

Likewise, Abu Hilal al-Askari attributed the emergence of Arabic singing to Jaradti, he identified them as they belong to Abdullah bin Jud’an. Al-Qalqashandi, however, contends that singing in the Arabian Peninsula predates the era of Jarada and has been known since the time of Ād.

=== Ancient history ===
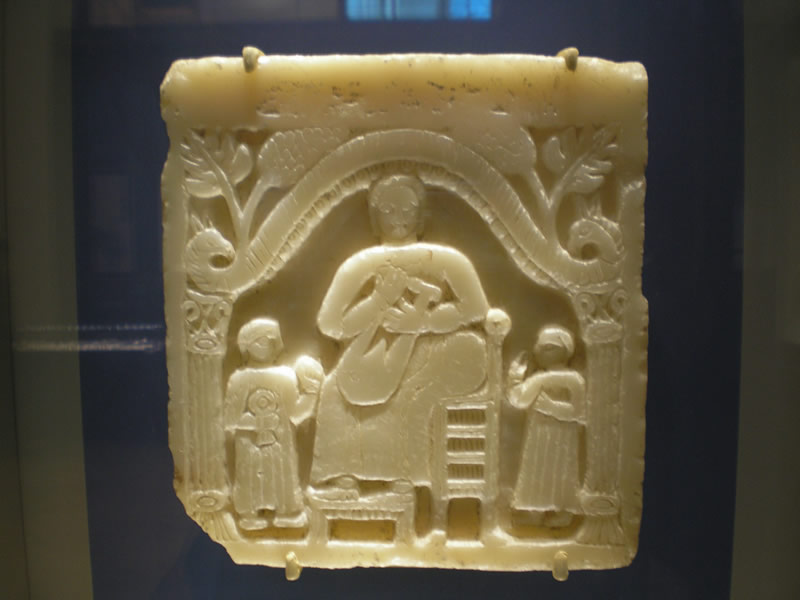
A funerary stela featuring a musical scene, 1st century AD

In the Arabian Peninsula, historian al-Masudi traced the origin of Arabic singing to what he called the "Hada," stating, "The Hada is the origin of singing." According to his account, when camels became exhausted on their long journeys, they required something to stimulate them and help them forget the pain of hunger, thirst, and heavy loads—thus, the "Hada" served as one of the best means of revival. He also noted that Yemen was familiar with two distinct types of singing—Himyarite and Hanafi—with Yemenis preferring the latter. The beautiful vocal quality known as "al-Jadan" is said to derive its name from Ali bin Zaid Dhi Jadan, one of the kings of Himyar, whose epithet "Dhi Jadan" celebrated the beauty of his voice.

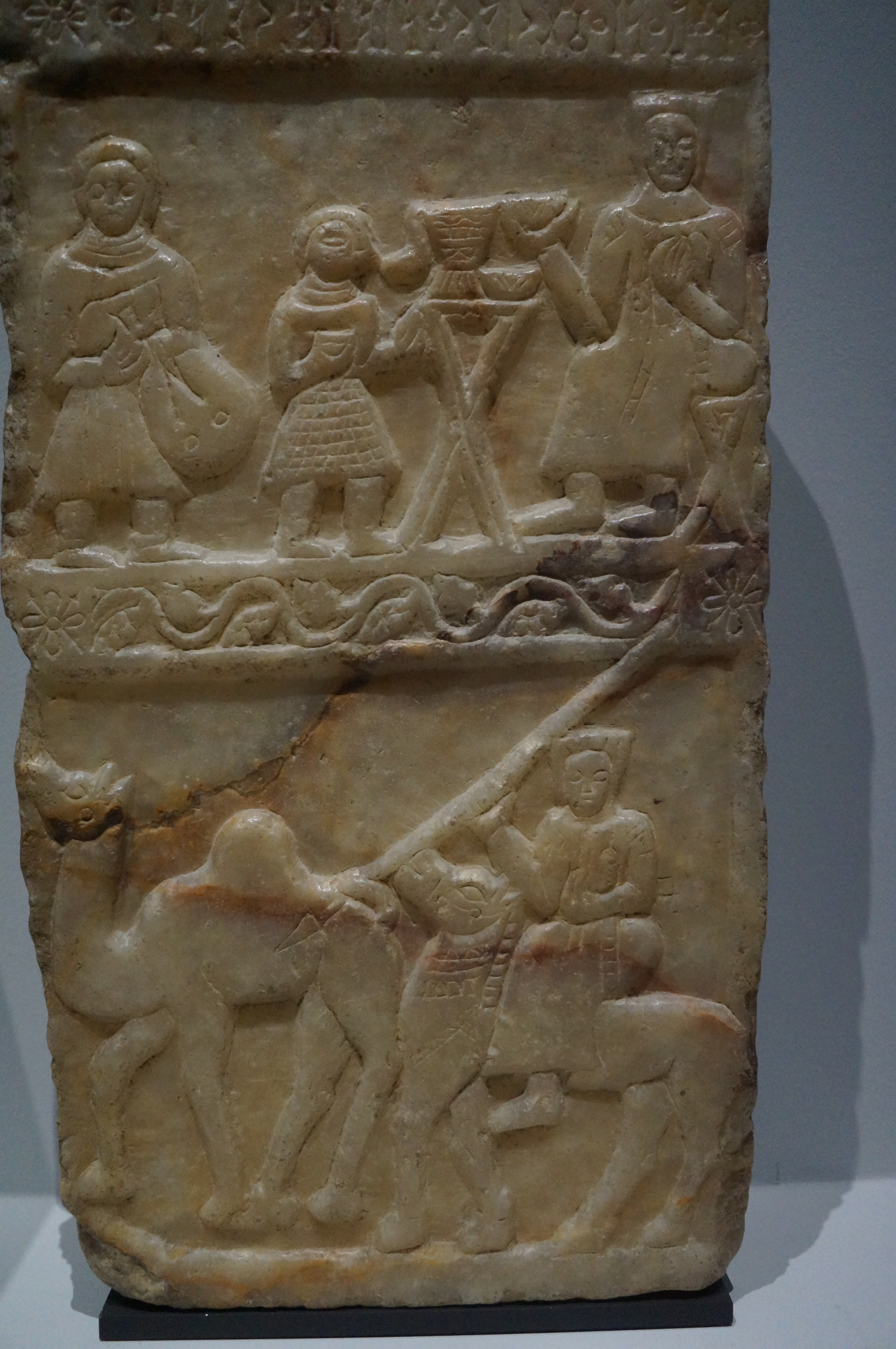
Funerary stele, in the upper band: banquet scene with three people, in the lower band: camel driver with two camels; 1st–3rd centuries AD; alabaster; height: 55 cm (21 1/2 in.); Louvre-Lens (Lens, France)

Dr. Muhammad Basalama also observes that the history of singing in Yemen extends back to the Sabaean and Minaean civilisations, as evidenced by the widespread use of musical instruments depicted on gravestones carved in marble and lime—often played by women.

=== Post-classical history (Middle age) ===
Yemeni singers have risen to prominence in various eras. At the close of the Umayyad period and the dawn of the Abbasid era, Ibn Tanbur became renowned for his light style of singing, known as "al-Hazj" (Close to the meaning of The Rhyme). Historians have described him as one of the most eloquent and agile singers. For instance, Al-Isfahani, in his book Kitab al-Aghani, distinguishes between three vocal traditions—Arabic, Yemeni, and Roman—citing, among other examples, how Ibrahim Al-Mawsili performed a Yemeni tune. Zabid has long been a thriving centre of musical prosperity in the Middle Ages, particularly during the era of the Najahid state. The Najahid family, of Ethiopian origin and following in the footsteps of their Zaydi forebears, were prominent patrons of the musical arts. However, with the collapse of the Najahid state, this flourishing tradition gradually diminished, and many of its distinctive elements may have migrated and dispersed over time. A brief reappearance had occurred during the reign of Imam Sharaf Al-Din and his son Al-Muzaffar. During this time, a celebrated singer performed in the palace of the Turkish governor in Sanaa, and credit for his fame is attributed to Isa bin Lutfallah, the grandson of Imam Sharaf Al-Din. Notably, the prohibition and subsequent suppression of singing during that era is underscored by the absence of this singer's name in contemporary accounts of his art.

=== Early modern history ===
==== Turkish influence ====
When Yemen became part of the Ottoman Empire, it retained strong ties to its musical heritage—particularly the period of the Rasulid dynasty (1229–1453). This era is closely associated with the emergence of the Humini muwashshah in Yemen, a form that became integral to Sanaa's singing tradition. The earliest Humini muwashshah still performed in Sanaa is attributed to the poet Ahmed bin Fleita (d. 1331), whose renown spread during the reign of a struggling Rasulid king. According to Dr. Muhammad Abdo Ghanem, the muwashshah form was introduced to Yemen by the Ayyubids (1173–1229). Once in Yemen, however, it assumed a distinct local character—a blend of colloquial and classical elements—and became the poetic foundation of both the Rasulid court's performances and Sufi lodge chants. Although this style, which flourished in Tihama, Taiz, and Aden, later declined with the fall of the Rasulid dynasty, it experienced a revival under Ottoman patronage, either through musical concerts organised by the Turkish ruler in Sanaa or via support for Sufi groups that continue to practice religious chanting.

The earliest documented evidence of Turkish influence on Sanaa singing appears in the book Sanaa Singing Poetry by Dr. Muhammad Abdo Ghanem—a study for which he received his doctorate from the University of London in 1968 and which was published in 1970. In his study, Ghanem concludes that the Turks made a significant contribution to the development of Yemeni music. He cites an account by Issa bin Lutfallah, the grandson of Al-Mutahhar bin Sharaf Al-Din, who recounted musical concerts held in the residence of the Turkish ruler in Sanaa. Ghanem further notes that Turkish influence extended beyond these concerts to include a broader renewal and diversification of Yemeni musical composition.

Yemeni music critic Gamal Hasan sees that the incorporation of Turkish musical elements did not diminish the uniqueness of Yemeni singing. Rather, the Turkish presence in Yemen left lasting social and cultural influences—music being no exception. Turkish music is recognised as one of the sources of Yemeni singing, alongside indigenous influences that emerged in areas under Ottoman control. Yemeni singing, renowned for its antiquity, served as a reference for the people of the Hijaz and other parts of the Arabian Peninsula. For example, Safina Shihab al-Din's research on songs used in Egypt until the mid-19th century reveals roles written in Yemeni dialects and even identifies Ibn Fleita's muwashshah Li fi Raba Hajar—the oldest Humayni muwashshah still in use within the Sanaa singing tradition.

=== Modern music ===
Art critics date the emergence of modern song in Yemen's northern provinces to the period of Sheikh Saad Abdullah, who memorised three thousand lyrical poems and enchanted both people and birds with his singing. He was killed in the city of Matnah in 1919 CE during Imam Yahya's siege of Sanaa to expel the Turks. In the southern provinces, a vibrant group of artists emerged during the British occupation of Aden (1839–1967), with singing and music becoming widespread among Yemeni artists. Professor Muhammad Murshid Naji noted that Lahji singing prior to the era of Ahmed Fadhl al-Qumindan was influenced by the Sana'ani style. Lahji singers would perform Sana'ani songs, and the singer Hadi Sabit al-Nubi developed his oud-playing by drawing on the techniques of a northern artist whose name remains unrecorded. Naji attributes the emergence of the first Lahji melody to the poet, composer, and singer Fadhl Mater, who is credited with inventing the initial melody set to the Lahji rhythm—an innovation that led Hadi Sabit to sing in the Sana'ani style over one of Al-Qumandan's poems.

==== Indian and Egyptian Influences ====
In the 1920s and 1930s, Indian musical influences became prominent as numerous musical and theatre groups, as well as films, were introduced in Aden and Hadhramaut, which had long been under the administration of the British Viceroy of India. By the 1940s and 1950s, Yemeni musicians had adapted these influences to create an "Arabized" Indian style, in which tunes from Indian films were reinterpreted with texts set in classical Arabic rather than colloquial language. The acclaimed artist Muhammad Juma Khan, known for his mastery of the Hadhrami style, became one of the foremost practitioners of this hybrid form.

The distinctive features of Adeni singing developed during the twentieth century as a result of the convergence of multiple Yemeni and foreign musical elements, especially from India. Though a large portion of Aden's pre-independence population was of Indian origin, the evolution of Adeni song was notably influenced by Egyptian melodies, and some musicians even incorporating Western rhythms such as the waltz.

== Genres ==
Yemeni singing is characterised by its diversity, with no single centralised hub dominating its development. According to the Yemeni music critic Gamal Hasan, the diversity is partly due to the wide range of Yemeni dialects, but it also reflects several other factors—most notably the fragmented political landscape that has prevented the establishment of a stable cultural centre. The lack of a sustained, unified political and civil structure meant that a uniform artistic taste never fully emerged. Moreover, factors such as social stagnation—often linked to class privileges and reinforced by political, religious, regional, or tribal dynamics—have further contributed to the regional variation in singing styles. As a result, each Yemeni region has developed its own distinct musical expressions, with unique melodic forms that vary widely regardless of their apparent simplicity or monotony.

There are five widely regional genres or "colours" (lawn) of Yemeni music; Sanaani, Yafi'i, Laheji, Adeni, and Hadhrami. While some sources expand this classification to include additional styles such as Tihami and Taizzi. However, Jaber Ali Ahmed—widely regarded as the pioneer of Yemeni music criticism—argues in his book Trends of Renewal of Singing in Yemen that these classifications are relatively recent, emerging between the late nineteenth and early twentieth centuries. He argues that these categorisations are scientifically flawed because they fail to capture the distinct character of various regions and do not reflect the true richness of Yemeni singing. According to Jaber, this division is a result of the regional fragmentation that occurred during the British colonial period that resulted the Federation of the Emirates of South Arabia.

=== Sana'ani ===
Sana'a al-Haneen, performed by Hussain Moheb

Sanaa has a rich musical tradition and is particularly renowned for the musical style called al-Ghina al-San'ani (Arabic: الغناء الصنعاني al-ġināʾ aṣ-Ṣanʿānī), or "the song of Sanaa", which dates back to the 14th century and was designated as a UNESCO Intangible Cultural Heritage on 7 November 2003. This style of music is not exclusive to Sanaa, and is found in other areas of Yemen as well, but it is most closely associated with the city. It is often part of social events, including the samra, or evening wedding party, and the magyal, or daily afternoon gathering of friends.

Researchers trace the earliest known Sana'ani song, "Ana Ya Abu Ya Ana," to approximately four centuries ago. However, this song likely existed in multiple variants—originally chanted by farmers with differing melodies—and evolved over the centuries to reach its current form.

Efforts to modernise Sana'ani singing have been limited, with attempts made to preserve its character as it existed several centuries ago, or at least over the last two centuries. The rugged terrain around Sanaa fostered isolation, restricting the influx of external melodic influences that were more prevalent in coastal regions such as Hadhramaut, Aden, and Lahj. Additionally, Sana'ani singing is noted for its distinct maqam forms, which use quarter-tone intervals, setting it apart from other regional styles.

The basic format of the Sana'ani singing consists of a singer accompanied by two instrumentalists, one playing the qanbus (Yemeni lute) and the other playing the sahn nuhasi, which is a copper tray balanced on the musician's thumbs and played by being lightly struck by the other eight fingers. Lyrics are in both classical Arabic and Yemeni Arabic and are known for their wordplay and emotional content. Singers often use melismatic vocals, and the arrangements feature pauses between verses and instrumental sections. Skilled performers often "embellish" a song's melody to highlight its emotional tone.

In the earliest days of the recording industry in Yemen, from 1938 into the 1940s, Sanaani music was the dominant genre among Yemenis who could afford to buy records and phonographs (primarily in Aden). As prices fell, Sanaani-style records became increasingly popular among the middle class, but at the same time, it began to encounter competition from other genres, including Western and Indian music as well as music from other Arab countries. The earliest Sanaani recording stars generally came from wealthy religious families. The most popular was Ali Abu Bakr Ba Sharahil, who recorded for Odeon Records; other popular artists included Muhammad and Ibrahim al-Mas, Ahmad Awad al-Jarrash, and Muhammad Abd al-Rahman al-Makkawi.

=== Hadhrami ===
Mizmar Al-Habeesh (Arabic: مزمار الهبيش), a Coastal Hadhrami song

The music of Hadhramaut is one of the most prominent forms of Arabic music. Its distinctive maqamat and signature vocal styles—featuring full performances in the Hadhrami Arabic dialect, unique rhythmic patterns, and a characteristic humming style known as Dan—have made it a vital component of the Yemeni music. This genre reflects a rich blend of local traditions and foreign influences, drawing from Indian and African musical elements, in part due to Hadhramaut's strategic position along the ancient incense road. The music has also been deeply shaped by Sufism.

Key figures in the Dan tradition include poets such as Haddad bin Hassan al-Kaf and Hussein al-Muhdar, alongside renowned performers like Saeed Awad, Haddad al-Kaf, Karama Mursal, and Abu Bakr Salem Balfaqih. In particular, the partnership of Abu Bakr Salem Balfaqih and poet Hussein Al-Mehdhar is widely recognised for transforming and disseminating the Hadhrami Dan style both within and beyond Yemen.

Hadhrami music has not only enriched Yemeni cultural heritage but has also significantly influenced the musical landscapes of regions beyond the Arabian Peninsula, notably in parts of Africa and East Asia.

=== Lahji ===
Faisal Alawi performing a Lahji song

When singing in Sanaa was banned by the Imams, many performers fled to the South Yemen or other countries. According to Gamal Hasan, the court of the Sultans of Lahij (Abdali Sultanate), served as a refuge for these artists during the nineteenth and early twentieth centuries—long before Lahj emerged as a prominent centre of singing under the patronage of one of its princes. Originally, Lahj's musical heritage consisted of a repertoire of chants and simple melodies. The Sultans of Al-Abadali trace their roots to the Arhab region north of Sanaa. They arrived in Lahj as part of the army of Imam Al-Mutawakkil Ala Allah Al-Qasim in the late eighteenth century, and following the fragmentation of the Qasimid kingdom due to internal divisions, they eventually established independent rule over Lahj and Aden.

The development of Lahji singing can be attributed to Prince Ahmed bin Fadhl Al-Abdali (widely known as Al-Qumandan), who played a key role in re-establishing political independence through his revival of Lahji singing in the early twentieth century. In one of his songs, Al-Qumandan touches upon the decline of Sanaa singing, Hasan attributes that as an attempt to politically distance the court from the dominance of that style and, perhaps, assert pride in Lahji's distinct cultural identity. The rise of recorded music in Aden allowed Al-Qumandan to gain exposure to foreign melodic influences, helped by his privileged position as a prince, which enabled him to acquire records from India and Egypt. Through his talent and creativity, he successfully integrated these foreign musical elements into Lahji singing while maintaining the genre's inherent uniqueness. After Al-Qumandan's death in 1941, new melodies began to appear, but Lahji singing did not undergo significant evolution. Instead, it experienced a period of stagnation, retaining its traditional melodies as it struggled to introduce innovative changes.

The song "Ya Ward Ya Kadhi," set in the Bayati maqam, is one of Al-Qumindan's most renowned compositions and has become a staple at Yemeni weddings. Its uniqueness lies in Al-Qumindan's ambition to emulate the rumba rhythms he had encountered. Promising his close associates that he would perform a "rumba" song for them, he secluded himself during Ramadan to create this piece, resulting in a lively, joyful tune that inspires dancing. The melody unfolds gradually, beginning with a modest refrain and then moving into the repeated chant of "Ya Ward Ya Kadhi...," where the 'Re' note is reiterated continuously and the vocal extension is emphasised on "Ya Kadhi..."

The melodic journey expands further with repeated phrases on the 'Sol' note in "Ya Qamri Al Wadi." At this point, Gamal Hasan considers Al-Qumindan's melodic approach as innovative and daring, as he makes an unprecedented leap from C to F—a move that is exceptional in traditional Yemeni singing, which typically relies on subtle, gradual transitions.

Al-Qumindan also incorporated traditional local rhythms, such as the zaffa and the marous, into the song. By drawing on the melodic theme, he crafted what is considered the first Yemeni rumba—and perhaps even the first Arab rumba—according to Hasan, imbuing the composition with a distinct local character.

=== Adeni ===
Sabooha khatabha Naseeb (Arabic: صبوحة خطبها نصيب), a popular Adeni song

During the twentieth century, Aden emerged as a major hub for Yemeni singing. It was there that the first recordings of Sanaa singing—and various other forms of Yemeni music, including those of Yemeni Jews—were produced. Record production companies played a significant role in fostering artistic activity, marking what Gamal Hasan considers "the first bourgeois singing phenomenon in Yemen". Following independence, however, these companies gradually withdrew as a socialist trend took hold, and musical production became state-sponsored.

The distinctive features of Adeni singing developed during the twentieth century as a result of the convergence of multiple Yemeni musical elements. Although a large portion of Aden's pre-independence population was of Indian origin, the evolution of Adeni song was notably influenced by Egyptian melodies. This influence is especially evident in the works of Ahmed Qasim. With his academic background in music, Qasim sought to refine the melodic structure and place greater emphasis on the musical refrain. He diversified the melody and enhanced maqam transitions in several compositions, even incorporating Western rhythms such as the waltz. Songs like "I Miss You" and "We Met by Chance" represent early attempts to broaden the appeal of Yemeni singing beyond its local context and integrate it into the wider Arab musical landscape. Nonetheless, according to Hasan, his approach appeared less pragmatic compared to that of his contemporary Mohammed Saad Abdullah, even though both are recognised as key figures in Yemeni composition and singing.

=== Yafa'a ===
Qiff ya zain (Arabic: قف يا زين, romanized: Stop, oh Beautiful), a popular Yafi'i song

== Instruments ==
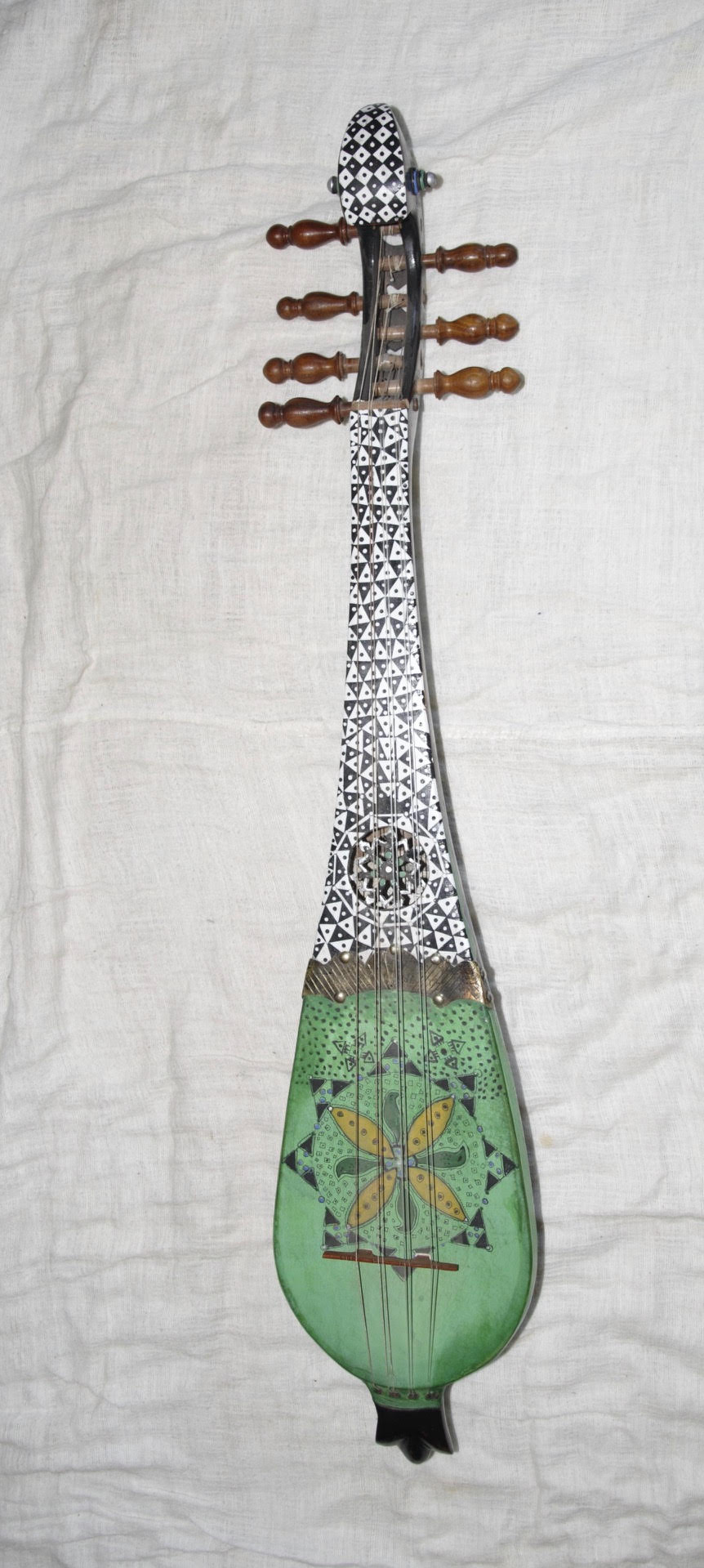
The Yemeni Qanbus

- Oud: A stringed instrument similar to a lute, played with a plectrum.
- Qanbus: a short-necked lute that originated in Yemen.
- Ney / Qasaba: A hollow wooden flute with finger holes, played by blowing into it.
- Mizmar: A double-reed woodwind instrument with a piercing sound, often used in celebratory and processional music.
- Darabouka: made from clay, brass, or metal, consists of a covered side and an open side, played in various sizes, and its rhythmic structure is created by striking or tapping with the hands or drumsticks.
- Duff: A drum with a single goatskin or plastic membrane on a round wooden frame, is played by striking it with hands and fingers, and it often includes metal plates, stitched with a two-threaded thread, and can contain small metal bells or zills, with different sizes such as the Duff and Al-ttar.
- Hajer Drum: crafted from marine teak wood, features a cylindrical body adorned with distinctive rings and a goatskin drumhead, with its size and dimensions tailored to the specific music it accompanies, and it is played by striking it with hands or drumsticks.
- Mirwas Drum: is the smallest drum used in Hadramout, and the sharpest. It is held in one hand and the drummer plays it with the palm of their other hand.
- Marfaa’ / Maten Drum: is similar to the Mirwas in form, but differs in size and quality of sound. Mainly it has a larger diameter and produces a less salient sound.
- Tabla / Banqaz: introduced to traditional Hadrami music in the early 1970s, comprises two wooden cylindrical drums of varying sizes, covered with plastic drumheads, typically measuring 6 cm and 8 cm in diameter, and it is played by striking the drumheads with the hands or drumsticks.
- Maraqis: consists of two flat wooden pieces held in both hands and clapped together to synchronize with the sound of dancers' clapping, serving as a rhythmic element that adds consistent and harmonious musical tones when played alongside other instruments.
- Dan: A genre of vocal melodies, characterized by rhythmic improvisational singing of poets, showcasing range, strength, and clarity of voice in competitive contests.

== Patriotic music ==
"Bara'a Ya Istimar", a song against the British presence in Yemen

The national song emerged in Yemen amid intense political turmoil, when the idea of national resistance against the British rule in Democratic Yemen took root, and northern Yemen began to reject the imposition of the Imamate's rule. This musical phenomenon became particularly significant in tandem with two major revolutions—26 September 1962, and 14 October 1963.

Aden became the cradle of this transformation in music, largely due to its openness to the world and the influx of musical influences, notably from the Arab Republic of Egypt. In contrast, Sanaa suffered decades of isolation under the Imamate, which hindered its cultural and musical exchange.

In the North, leading figures in Yemeni revolutionary art include Abdullah al-Baradouni, Dr. Abdulaziz Al-Maqaleh, Saleh Sahlol, Muhammad Mahmoud Al-Zubairi, Al-Qardaei, among many others. These artists enriched their poetry with revolutionary themes, and numerous Yemeni writers have amplified this impact both domestically and internationally. Prominent among them are Abdullah Abdul-Wahhab Noman (Al-Fadhol), Mutahhar Al-Eryani, Ali Sabra, and Jaber Rizq.

Many poets’ works have been transformed into songs that resonate widely with the Yemeni people. Examples of iconic revolutionary song works include the collaboration of the duo Al-Khader and Al-Anesi on "Our Army, O Our Army... Our Army, O Hero"; Al-Sunidar's "I Am the People"; Ali Al-Samah's "My Brother, O Youth of Redemption"; There is also a poignant song by the artist Hamoud Zaid Issa, which echoes the sentiments of Yemeni immigrants: "My brother the immigrant, the time of the individual has passed, and your free people have displaced the family of tyranny." Likewise, Abu Al-Hawarith Mohammed Hamoud declares, "This is my land and this is my homeland; I will sacrifice my soul and blood for it." Among these also is Ayoub Tarish's stirring refrain:

"Long live the September of Liberation,

Dawn of struggle, A revolution that moves with faith on the path of excellence—

It crushes the oppressor, destroys injustice, and brings about the impossible."

Additionally, the Thulati Kawkabani were instrumental in shaping the national song. Their popularity surged after they performed the stirring anthem "Oh Sallal, Oh Sword of God, Oh Destroyer of the Enemies of God", in honour of President Al-Sallal during the Seventy Day Siege, significantly boosting the morale of the army.

In the South, many patriotic songs emerged during the 14 October Revolution, performed by artists such as Mohamed Morshed Naji, Mohamed Mohsen Atroush, Mohamed Saad Abdullah, Ahmed Qasim, Mohamed Abdo Zaidi, and others. These songs introduced a new musical style that reflected the revolutionary spirit—a shift toward a musical expression of resistance against colonial rule, updating both the form and content of traditional songs.

This evolution is exemplified in works like Al-Morshedy's "Akhy Kablouni," (My brother, they have tied me) whose lyrics poignantly capture the relationship between the citizen and the coloniser, conveying the deep oppression and tyranny endured by those yearning for freedom.

Similarly, Mohamed Mohsen Atroush's well-known song, "Get out, colonialism, from the land of the free," features an inspiring melody that galvanises listeners against oppression. In response, the voice of artist Youssef Ahmed Salem echoes, "October, the holiday of the revolution, we shattered the legend in you." Furthermore, among the most emblematic pieces of this revolutionary period is "We Revolted" by Ahmed bin Ahmed Qasim, a song that powerfully embodies the genuine struggle against British colonial rule, in addition to: "O Brother, O Son of Yemen... You Are the Past, You Are in the Mouth of Time.".

Southerners writers and poets that have amplified this impact include: Al-Mehdhar and Lutfi Jaafar Aman.

== Rap music ==
Rap and hip-hop culture existed as early as 2005 but it only achieved widespread popularity in 2008 when the hip-hop in Yemen took a leap forward and began to spread around the youth of Yemen, especially in Sanaa and Aden.

The hip-hop major outbreak in Yemen is often associated to the influence of Hajaj Abdulqawi Masaed (also graphed as Hagage Masaed or best known as "AJ"), an American-Yemeni rapper producing music since 1997. Although he had grown in the United States, AJ has successfully reached Yemeni audience by addressing to local issues and incorporating traditional musical language into his hits. This versatility was also one of the reasons he drew international recognition, since he entered in the Yemeni music scene, he has been partnering up with several Yemeni artists, such as Hussein Muhib, Fuad Al-Kibisi, Fuad Al-Sharjabi, Ibrahim Al-Taefi, Abdurahman Al-Akhfash and others, and helping new ones to develop their talents. He has also played a major role on propagating the understanding of rap as a means of change.

One contributing factor to the development of the music is also the creation of Yemen Music House in 2007 that has been providing assets to the development of a contemporary music scene. In 2009, took place the first Yemeni Rap public festival, co-sponsored by the French and German foreign-missions. Due to the importance of this event, AJ draws a comparison between it and the fall of the Berlin Wall.

== Notable people ==
- Abu Bakr Salem
- Karama Mursal
- Ahmed bin Ahmed Qassim
- Ayoob Tarish
- Jaber Ali Ahmed
- Abdel Rab Idris
- Arwa
- Ahmed Fathi
- Balqees Ahmed Fathi
- Mohamed Al-Harithy
- Faisal Alawi
- Muhammad Jumaa Khan
- Mohamed Sa'ad Abdullah
- Fuad al-Kabsi
- Muhammad Murshid Naji
- Ali Abdullah al-Simah
- Issa al-Laith
- Ofra Haza
- Hussein Moheb
- Saber Bamatraf

== See also ==
- Culture of Yemen
- Southeast Asian music
