= Ali Barakat =

Lebanese singer

Ali Barakat (born 1980) is a Lebanese singer known for his support of Hezbollah, a Shia Islamist political party and paramilitary group in Lebanon.

== Biography ==
Barakat is the son of Mohammed Barakhat. He is from Southern Lebanon, and his career began in 1997 at age 17 with songs resisting Israel's occupation of the region during the South Lebanon conflict.

Known for his pro-Hezbollah stance, Barakat rose to prominence in 2013 during Hezbollah's involvement in the Syrian civil war, with his music videos receiving hundreds of thousands of views on YouTube. He identifies as a supporter, though not a member, of Hezbollah.

In April 2014, Lebanese authorities issued a summons for Barakat, saying that his songs "harm Lebanon's relations" with Arab countries. One of Barakat's songs called Saudi Arabia, a major supporter of rebel groups in the Syrian civil war, a "terrorist". Barakat was detained in November of that year in the city of Nabatieh.

Lebanese prime minister Hassan Diab received Barakat at the Grand Serail in July 2020. Following the meeting, Barakat quoted Diab as saying that he had entered into a "direct confrontation with the U.S. ambassador Dorothy Shea". After the prime minister's office denied the allegation, Barakat deleted his post on social media.

According to MEMRI, Barakat said in 2021 that he was willing to become a suicide bomber upon the request of Hezbollah leader Hassan Nasrallah.

In August 2022, after journalist Dima Sadek made a satirical post on Twitter about Iran's involvement in the stabbing of Salman Rushdie, Barakat released a video saying: "Everyone who believes that Khomeini and Soleimani are sacred will know what to do with Dima Sadek." Sadek then began receiving violent threats online.

== Music ==
BuzzFeed News described Barakat's songs as "a mix of battle anthems and Arabic pop, turbo-charged with Shiite imagery". He has a baritone vocal range.

- Barakat's song "Israel Started the Fire" contains the lyrics "Israel started the fire. With our blood, we will extinguish it."
- The song "Ya Zainab" calls for Shiites to defend a shrine in Damascus from the Syrian rebel group Al-Nusra Front: "We came to fight you / Nasrallah orders us to tremble the land / We will raise our flag above the strongholds / I am Hezbollah, the one you know." BuzzFeed News said it was Barakat's "best known song" as of December 2013.
- Another song, "We Will Defeat Them in Qalamoun", promotes the Hezbollah offensive in the Battle of Qalamoun: "We are giving the world a lesson on manliness like the sun / Qusayr was the first lesson, and Kalmoun for stomping heads."
- Barakat's song "Seal Your Victory in Yabroud" encourages Hezbollah to defeat its enemies, whom he calls takfiris, in the Syrian town of Yabroud: "We flattened the army of the Jews, and now it is your turn in Yabroud." The song was released in February 2014 and spread on social media by supporters of Syrian president Bashar al-Assad. After the song's release, Barakat received insults and threats and was accused of inciting sectarian violence.
- In 2014, Barakat posted a music video celebrating Iranian military commander Qasem Soleimani, showing him with the deceased Hezbollah soldier Jihad Mughniyah.
- Barakat released the song "For God’s Sake, Oh Sayyed Let’s Go" in October 2023, encouraging Nasrallah to "strike and destroy Tel Aviv."

== See also ==
- Issa al-Laith
- Julia Boutros
