= Jaber Ali Ahmed =

Yemeni musician (b. 1953)

Jaber Ali Ahmed جابر علي أحمد
- Also known as: The Pioneer of Yemeni music criticism
- Born: 1 January 1953; Hodeidah, North Yemen (now Yemen)
- Origin: Hodeida, Yemen
- Genres: Music of Yemen
- Occupations: Musician, music critic
- Instrument: Oud

Jaber Ali Ahmed (جابر علي أحمد; born 1953) is a Yemeni musician and music critic. He is recognised as a prominent figure in Yemen's musical scene and is noted for his critical and methodical approach to the history of Yemeni musical culture.

== Early life and education ==
Jaber Ali Ahmed completed his elementary and high school education in Hodeidah. Inspired by his older brother, Ahmed Ali Ahmed—who was also a musician—Jaber began performing for his friends and school colleagues. His talent earned him the support of a school instructor who, after returning from a visit to Cairo, gifted him an oud. During his school years in Hodeidah, Jaber performed at several national events commemorating the 26 September revolution.

He later received a scholarship to study philosophy at Damascus University. In 1982, he obtained a BA from the Higher Institute of Arabic Music in Cairo.

== Career ==
In 1983, Jaber Ali Ahmed assumed leadership of a musical band in Hodeidah and began his initial forays into music criticism. Through the band, he presented groups of poems, muwashshah performances, and musical shows, as well as introduced new vocal talents. Between 1985 and 1995, he taught music education to children at Al-Fath Model Schools in Hodeidah.

Since 1985, Jaber has been a member of the executive council of the Arab Music Academy. He also served as the director general of the Culture Office in Sana'a Governorate and has authored several musical studies and research projects. Over the years, he has participated in local, Arab, and international festivals, singing and composing for many of the most prominent Yemeni and Arab poets, including Abdullah al-Baradouni, Mahmoud Darwish, and Abdulaziz Al-Maqaleh.

== Critical engagement and music criticism ==
After graduating from the Higher Institute of Arabic Music, Jaber Ali Ahmed returned to Yemen carrying a range of musical ideas—some of which conflicted with local traditional musical culture, while others resonated with it. He became convinced that the establishment of a distinct Yemeni musical thought required considerable effort. Motivated by the enthusiasm of the youth, he began reevaluating the nation's conceptual framework and used the Yemeni newspaper Al-Thawra as a platform to present his views on various issues.

This public discourse led to disputes with critics who maintained that artistic matters were beyond reproach, whereas Ahmed argued that any intellectual movement should be grounded in methodological skepticism—a notion rooted in the work of the French philosopher René Descartes. Through his weekly columns in Al-Thawra, he introduced a number of insights and concepts. One notable idea was his critique of the prevailing tendency to evaluate all artists uniformly. According to Jaber, such a “one-size-fits-all” approach runs counter to the inherent diversity of artistic expression, which requires recognising innovative differences among individual artists. His unconventional views sparked vigorous debates with many artists and journalists.

Observing that many artists treat the press primarily as a promotional tool and that journalists often adopt this approach for pragmatic reasons, Ahmed's alternative method of criticism was met with suspicion. He endeavoured in numerous articles to clarify the nature and cultural role of music criticism, yet his efforts received limited acceptance. A number of writers and journalists—including Dr. Abu Bakr Al-Saqqaf, Professor Zain Al-Saqqaf, Professor Abdul Bari Taher, Dr. Amna Al-Nasiri, and Saleh Al-Dahhan—supported his approach, viewing it as a bold step toward establishing a rigorous foundation for music criticism in Yemen that moved beyond personal opinion to a more analytical evaluation of musical phenomena. This support bolstered his resolve to continue his work. In a dialogue with Arab Music Magazine in August 2023, Jaber noted that he still encounters resistance from certain artists, particularly those whom he described as excessively self-important and resistant to criticism.

Jaber Ali Ahmed distinguishes two main types of Yemeni lyrical heritage. The first comprises folk songs originating in rural areas. The second consists of traditional songs that develop in urban settings, where diverse musical genres converge and influence one another. This interaction has allowed folk elements to gain prominence by incorporating new techniques and ideas, ultimately shaping distinctive traditional genres.

Jaber Ali Ahmed described his 2007 book, From the Yemeni Music Scene, as a significant step toward establishing a critical framework for understanding Yemeni musical thought. The work examines two primary dimensions: an intellectual musical dimension and an evaluative dimension that addresses the overall image of the national musical landscape. According to Ahmed, the book objectively documents the emergence of Yemeni music and its connection to social life, highlighting the unique characteristics of Yemeni musical taste. It further explores key concepts related to content, form, and the broader musical discourse, while emphasising the need for a refined approach to musical criticism and a reconsideration of the concept of the popular song.

== Politics and music ==
Jaber Ali Ahmed's musical career is marked by a significant interplay between political and artistic objectives. His involvement with the Yemeni Revolutionary Democratic Party positioned him at the centre of the Yemeni leftist movement—a movement that sought to address the challenges emerging after the 26 September and 14 October revolutions. Motivated by the global leftist momentum of the 1960s and 1970s, Ahmed and his contemporaries endeavoured to reconcile revolutionary activism with artistic expression. His affinity for evocative poetry and participation in student gatherings in Damascus further reinforced his commitment to integrating music with political ideals. Notably, the enthusiastic public and official reception he received during a visit to Aden in the late 1970s encouraged him to pursue formal musical studies, which he regarded as essential for delving deeper into the art.

Ahmed has also cited the example of Lebanese musician Marcel Khalife as illustrative of the artistic efforts of leftist artists in the Arab world. He observed that Khalife's career in Lebanon flourished in an environment relatively free from internal censorship—a factor that allowed him to develop innovative musical expressions. In Ahmed's view, Khalife's strong artistic foundation enabled him to create musical works worthy of attention.

According to Jaber Ali Ahmed, political forces play a crucial role in either constraining or promoting cultural phenomena such as music. He argues that institutions enriched by cultural, media, and educational resources can significantly influence musical development. He also notes that historical precedents—such as those set during the era of Democratic Yemen, when music institutes were built, music education became mandatory in schools, and artists enjoyed considerable creative freedom—demonstrate the limits of political power. In contrast, the current Yemeni political climate, fraught with numerous challenges, has adversely affected the nation's musical landscape.

== Music criticism and cultural discourse ==
Jaber Ali Ahmed has expressed concerns regarding the use of terms such as “school” (for example, in “The school of certain type of music”) to describe a musical era or trend in Yemeni and broader Arab cultural life. He argues that—even when used metaphorically—such terminology removes the concept from its original epistemological context as it emerged in Europe during the Renaissance, where the term acquired significant philosophical depth. In his 2009 book, Trends of Renewing Singing in Yemen, Ahmed contends that while certain approaches within the Yemeni singing scene may be described in this way, such labels fail to convey a precise scientific understanding of the components of musical life in Yemeni society. He notes that the Arab Music Academy has adopted the terms “folk music” and “traditional music” to refer to aspects of the Arab musical heritage, yet innumerable individual efforts across the Arab world still require a robust theoretical foundation—a foundation, he believes, that can only be provided by a dedicated and rigorous critical movement.

In Trends of Renewing Singing in Yemen, Ahmed further observes that Yemeni music has largely eluded systematic study. He attributes this neglect to the limited interest of the Yemeni cultural movement, a shortfall that has adversely affected artists, intellectuals, and the general public. According to him, the absence of a musical cultural elite—one that integrates both practical and theoretical dimensions—is evident when journalists and politicians, who may lack the requisite musical expertise, attempt to address musical issues. This has resulted in an artistic discourse often dominated by superficial conclusions rather than a substantive musical analysis.

Ahmed also regards music criticism as a unique cultural phenomenon. He notes that in Europe, music criticism emerged in the seventeenth century alongside the rise of the press, with figures such as Karl Weber and Berlioz contributing to its development. In contrast, he argues, the movement of music criticism in Arab countries remains underdeveloped—a situation he attributes partly to a pervasive negative attitude toward criticism. Ahmed believes that many artists in the Arab world have yet to recognise the importance of criticism as a catalyst for creative growth. He identifies two principal factors contributing to the scarcity of music criticism: first, the inherent difficulty of formulating genuine music criticism, and second, the objective challenges posed by widespread hostility to criticism in public discourse.

Regarding the relationship between music and socialism, Ahmed maintains that their connection is rooted in addressing issues concerning the working class and marginalised communities. However, he observes that efforts to define a distinctive musical language for socialism have yielded inconclusive results. In his view, each historical era is built upon the musical heritage of its predecessors; the socialist contribution, therefore, lies in infusing humanistic content and deepening the expressive quality of musical works.

On the subject of tensions between religious scholars and musicians, Ahmed recalled a dialogue with an Islamist in which he inquired about the source of certain religious scholars’ aversion to music. The response—suggesting that some religious traditions fear the spiritual influence of music—surprised him. Ahmed noted, however, that the historical experience of Sufism in various Islamic countries demonstrates a capacity for coexistence and mutual influence between music and religious practice. He observes that since the tenth century, the Sufi movement has played a significant role in enhancing the expressive power of musical performance.

== Publications ==
Jaber Ali Ahmed's published works include:

- "حاضر الغناء في اليمن" (The Present of Singing in Yemen), 1996
- "من المشهد الموسيقي اليمني" (From the Yemeni Music Scene), 2007
- "تيارات تجديد الغناء في اليمن" (Trends of Renewing Singing in Yemen), 2009

== See also ==
- Music of Yemen
- Ahmed Fathi
- Ahmed bin Ahmed Qasim
