= Faisal Alawi =

Faisal Alawi فيصل علوي
- Born: January 1, 1949; Lahij, Sultanate of Lahej
- Died: February 7, 2010 (aged 61) Khor Maksar, Aden, Yemen
- Genre: Traditional folk
- Occupation: Singer
- Instruments: Vocals, oud
- Years active: 1958–2010

Faisal Alawi (1949 – February 7, 2010) was a Yemeni singer and oudist from Lahej, considered a pioneer of Lahiji music. He was famous for playing the oud, and his fame spread throughout the Arabian Peninsula and the Gulf countries.

== Biography ==
Faisal Alawi performing

Faisal was born in 1949 in the village of Al-Shaq'a, Tuban, in the former Lahij sultanate. His father, Alawi Saad Al-Fatahi, was an artist, and his grandfather was a jurist and imam of a mosque. Faisal's first artistic work was in 1958, with his famous song "I Ask You with Love, O Beautiful Fatin" composed by Salih Nasser Kurd and lyrics by Ahmad Abbadi Hussein.

He studied at Al-Mahsaniya School, where all the sultans and artists studied, including Prince Ahmad Fadl Al-Qamandan, artist Fadl Muhammad Al-Lahiji, and poet Abdullah Hadi Sabit. Faisal Alawi became very famous in Lahij Governorate, to the extent that his name became synonymous with it.

He was influenced by the poet Prince Ahmad Fadl Al-Qamandan and sang many of his poems. He was also influenced by the artist Fadl Muhammad Al-Lahiji, who helped him and taught him the principles of music and art.

He is considered one of the most prominent artists in Yemen, with the largest presence, audience, and heritage, as his songs reached most Arab and Gulf countries, especially after he continued to travel between Yemen and several Arab and Gulf countries, where he performed many concerts and musical evenings in front of his large audience there.

== Hits ==
1. Ya'eebu 'ala al-nas wa al-'eeb fi-hum
2. Ghalt ya nas tas-hooni wa ana na-im
3. 'Ar-fat-ik qabl ma at-'arraf 'ala al-hub
4. Ya fu-'adi leh tab-ki taj-ri li-man dhi dam-'at-ik
5. 'Ar-fat al-nas illa an-ta ma-ka-ni aj-hal-ik
6. Ba tadh-karo-ni wa la-kin ba'd la ja-dwa li dhik-ri
7. Ana maj-rooh

== Illness and death ==
Alawi died after a struggle with illness at 9:00 am on Sunday, February 7, 2010, in room 101 of the Metropole Hotel in Khor Maksar, Aden.

== See also ==
- Abu Bakr Salem
