= Karama Mursal =

Yemeni singer (1946–2014)

Karama Mursal كرامة مرسال
- Birth name: Karama Saeed Ali Mursal
- Also known as: Karama Mursal, Abu Sabri
- Born: 1 January 1946; Mukalla, Hadramaut, Yemen
- Origin: Yemen
- Died: 3 August 2014 (aged 68); Hadhramaut, Yemen
- Genres: Hadhrami music
- Occupation: Singer-songwriter
- Instrument(s): Oud, violin
- Years active: 1963–2014

Karama Mursal was a Yemeni singer-songwriter born in Al-Mukalla, the capital of Hadhramaut Governorate, located in southeastern Yemen.

He began his artistic career in 1963, at the age of seventeen, singing the works of many Hadhrami poets, notably the Hadhrami poet Hussein Abu Bakr Al-Mihdhar, who played a significant role in the success of his songs. He also sang poems by Omar Abu Bakr Al-Aidarus, Ahmed Salim Al-Bayd, Ahmed Salim Bamatraf, Jam'an Bamatraf, Junaid Bawazeer, and Abbas Al-Dilmi.

He presented many patriotic works and had a significant impact on national singing.

== Birth and early life ==
Karama Mursal was born in 1946 in the old area of Al-Mukalla, the capital of Hadramaut Governorate. He grew up in the city's neighborhoods in a well-to-do and educated family. His talent for singing began to show during his childhood when he listened to his parents singing folk songs.

== Personal life ==
Mursal was married and had thirteen children. He lived in his villa in the Fuh neighborhood, west of Al-Mukalla. Additionally, he owned a chalet in Muscat, a house in Kuwait, and property in Jeddah.

Mursal was known for his lightheartedness and humorous spirit. His performances and television interviews were often filled with humor and witty remarks. He was also known for his boldness and lack of shyness. In one of his television interviews, he described local production companies as thieves and robbers.

In an interview with Al-Thawra newspaper, Mursal was asked about love, to which he replied: "Love is the light of life, and a life without love is worthless." When asked about women, he said: "Women are the lifeblood; they are mothers, sisters, and wives." He answered on the subject of Yemeni unity: "It's a symbol of Yemen's strength in the past, present, and future." He also described the region of Al-Shihr, saying: "It's happiness, love, the haven of poets, and their inspiration." When asked about the film Farewell, he called it "one of the most difficult and emotional things."

== Fame and stardom ==
Karama Mursal started his artistic journey in 1963, at the age of seventeen, when the Yemeni artist Mohammed Juma Khan died, leaving a void in the music scene. However, Mursal began to fill that void and gained popularity by performing folk concerts and weddings, singing songs by Mohammed Juma Khan, which served as a strong stepping stone for his presence in the music scene.

In addition to his singing talent and distinctive voice, Mursal was also known for his skill in composing. Throughout his career, he composed many songs for prominent Yemeni and Gulf artists. He began releasing his first songs and albums in 1969 when he met the poet Hussein Abu Bakr Al-Mahdhar, and he composed his songs himself and released his first albums. He continued working with him and the artist Abu Bakr Salem until the death of poet Hussein Abu Bakr Al-Mahdhar in 2000.

During his artistic career, Mursal presented many songs that became famous for their Hadhrami style, notably the song "Matem" (Infatuated), which received admiration from Gulf and Arab audiences. It was covered by other Gulf Arab singer, including Rashed Al-Majed and the band Miami Band. Additionally, Mursal had a substantial contribution to national songs in the Arab world and Yemen, such as the song "Hobbi Laha" (My Love for Her).

Today, Mursal is widely recognized in the Yemeni music scene and the broader Gulf Arab region. He annually performed in more than six private and public concerts across the Gulf Arab countries, especially in Kuwait, Muscat, and Saudi Arabia.

== Death ==
Karama Mursal died on Sunday, 3 August 2014, in Hadhramaut, Yemen, at the age of 68, after battling a serious illness. His death was announced by official media sources.

== See also ==
- List of Yemeni people
