= Sultanate of Tarim =

- 1916–1945
- Sultanate of Tarim (Yemen)
- Capital: Tarim
- Religion: Islam
- Government: Sultanate
- Sultan
  - 1916–1924: Muhsin ibn Ghalib al-Kathiri
- History
  - Separated from Kathiri: 1916
  - Tarimese Civil War: 1926–1927
  - Re-incorporated into Kathiri: 1945
- Today part of: Yemen

The Sultanate of Tarim was a state in Yemen created after a division of power within the Kathiri sultanate in 1916. It was first ruled by Muhsin ibn Ghalib al-Kathiri. Jam'iyat al-Haqq was responsible for civil affairs of Tarim. In exchange for maintaining control of Tarim, the al-Kaf family gave the Kathiri sultanate a monthly stipend. After Muhsin ibn Ghalib al-Kathiri's death at the end of 1924, his successor, sultan Salim, served only as a figurehead, with real power falling to an organization called "the league". Opposition to the league's taxation system led to a civil war in 1926, when the Tamimi tribe revolted and surrounded Tarim. The Kathiri sultanate sent 60 troops to aid the Tarimese sultan, and even though they were successful in breaking the siege, casualties convinced the Kathiri commander, Husayn b. Hamid al-Mihdhar, to withdraw. Ultimately, the civil war ended with a peace agreement in 1927. The sultanate was re-incorporated into Kathiri in March 1945.
