= Matnah =

Matnah مَتْنَة
- Village
- Location in Yemen Matnah (Middle East) Matnah (Asia)
- Coordinates: 15.25333°N 44.02472°E
- Country: Yemen
- Governorate: Sanaa
- District: Bani Matar
- Elevation: 9,157 ft (2,791 m)
- Time zone: UTC+3 (Yemen Standard Time)

Matnah (Arabic: مَتْنَة) is a small village in Bani Matar District of Sanaa Governorate, Yemen. Located to the southeast of Jabal An-Nabi Shu'ayb, it serves as a stopping place on the road between Sanaa and Al-Hudaydah.

== History ==
The earliest known mention of Matnah in historical sources is in 1275 (674 AH). It had a reservoir, mentioned in the Ghayat al-Amani of Yahya ibn Al-Husayn, as well as in a manuscript by Muhammad ibn Salah al-Sharafi.
