= Issa al-Laith =

Yemeni vocalist and poet

Issa al-Laith عيسى الليث
- Born: Issa Hassan Muhammad Ali Al-Laith; 1985 (age 40–41); Khamis Mushait, Saudi Arabia
- Occupations: Vocalist and poet
- Political party: Houthis
- Children: 4
- Website: @IssaAllaith on X

Issa Al-Laith also spelt Issa Allaith, Issa Al-Layth (Arabic: عيسى الليث) is a Yemeni vocalist and poet affiliated with the Houthi movement (Ansar Allah). Issa al-Laith is described as a popular zamil performer and poet for the Houthis, and is regularly featured on various Houthi media networks.

== Biography ==
Issa al-Laith was born in 1985 in Khamis Mushait, Saudi Arabia, to a Shiite Zaidi family from the Razih district of Saada Governorate, Yemen. Issa grew up in Saada governorate, where he completed his Quranic and secular education. He is a member of the Houthi movement and is married and the father of four children.

As a vocalist and poet, the main theme of his poetry concerns the glorification of Houthi fighters and Palestine, as well as opposing the Saudi-led intervention in Yemen, being described as a champion of the Houthi cause. Many of his zawamil enjoy hundreds of thousands to millions of views on various social media platforms. The zamil, rooted in cultural tradition, has been weaponised by the Houthis as a tool of propaganda and remains one of the most popular and rapidly growing platforms of Houthi propaganda, sung by popular vocalists like Issa Al-Laith and disseminated through various social media platforms including YouTube, Twitter and Telegram. The Spectator describes Houthi zawamil as its most successful part of their propaganda, stressing the movement's supposed piety, bravery and poverty in comparison with the corruption, wealth and hypocrisy of their adversaries, the Saudi-led coalition, and Arab states allied to Israel.

In 2023, YouTube closed various channels affiliated with the Houthis, including the channel of Issa.
