= Fuad al-Kibsi =

Yemeni singer

Fuad al-Kibsi playing the Oud

Fuad al-Kibsi (Arabic: فؤاد الكبسي) is a Yemeni singer. He is among the most popular singers and musicians in Yemen. Most of his music are of ancient scholarly and oral traditions of Yemen. He is son of the famous Yemeni poet, Abdallah Hashim al-Kibsi.

== Early life ==
al-Kibsi was born in 1961 in Sanaa. He learned music from his father and he was influenced by famous Yemeni singers like al-Sunaidar, al-Anisi and al-Harithi. He studied commerce in Sana University and he also studied Quranic studies and Arabic syntax and morphology.

== Albums ==
Title	Details
Maa Alasaf Ghaltan	Release date: 1992
Tem Al Gamil Ya Gamil	Release date: 1992
Dhaa Al Tareeq	Release date: 1994
La Atab	Release date: 1996
Ahebat Roba Sana'a	Release date: 1998
Jalsat Tarab 1998	Release date: 1998
Ashkai Bamen Walaoni	Release date: 1999
Khali Al Amr Aadi	Release date: 1999
Thakrayat Man Al Turath Jalsah	Release date: 2000
Al Habib Samar	Release date: 2000
Al Habib	Release date: 2000
Ya Salam	Release date: 2000
Jalsat Thekrayat	Release date: 2000
Ya Rab Ya Rahman	Release date: 2001
Ya Man Ala Al Arsh Aatalayt	Release date: 2002
Najran Concert	Release date: 2002
Moshtaq Ya Sana'a	Release date: 2002
Khalawni Artah	Release date: 2002
Kuwait Concert	Release date: 2003
Man Ghana Raqas	Release date: 2003
Ya Balabel	Release date: 2004
Enta al Ajmal	Release date: 2006
Taranim 2006	Release date: 2006
Bahager Allah	Release date: 2009
