= Abu Bakr Salem =

Yemeni singer (1939–2017)

Abu Bakr Salem أبو بكر سالم بلفقية
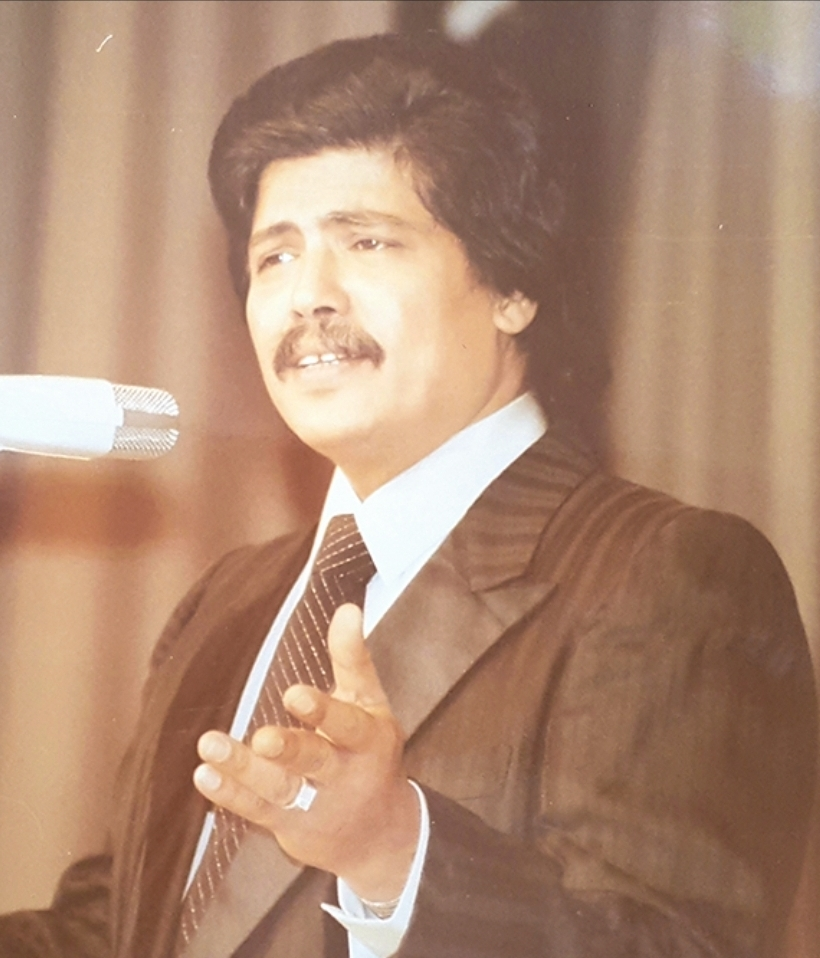

Background information
- Born: أبو بكر ابن سالم ابن زين بلفقية; 17 March 1939; Tarim, Sultanate of Tarim
- Died: 10 December 2017 (aged 78) Riyadh, Saudi Arabia
- Occupations: Singer, composer
- Years active: 1956–2017
- Musical career
- Genres: Hadhrami, Khaliji music, and Arabic music
- Instruments: Oud, vocal
- Label: Rotana

Abu Bakr Salem Balfaqih (Arabic: أبو بكر سالم بلفقية; 17 March 1939 – 10 December 2017), also known by his kunya Abu Aseel (Arabic: أبو اصيل), was a Yemeni-Saudi singer, poet, and composer of Hadhrami origins. He was nicknamed "The Father of Khaliji Music" (Arabic: أبو الغناء الخليجي) and "The one with the golden larynx" (Arabic: صاحب الحنجرة الذهبية). Abu Bakr is known in the Arab world for his unique voice.

Some of Abu Bakr's patriotic odes to Yemen celebrated historical events such as the abolition of the monarchy in the north in 1962, the independence of the south in 1967, and the unification of both the South and North Yemen in 1990, as well as songs in honour of his home region, Hadhramaut. In addition to the Yemeni nationality, Abu Bakr also held Saudi nationality after he moved to Saudi Arabia in the 1970s. He worked with other Khaliji music pioneers including Talal Maddah, Tariq Abdul-Hakim, and Abdulaziz Almufarrij (known by his stage name, Shadi Alkhaleej). His last release was a duet with young Yemeni singer and winner of the "Khaleeji Star" (a singing competition on the television) Fouad Abdulwahed.

== Early life and education ==
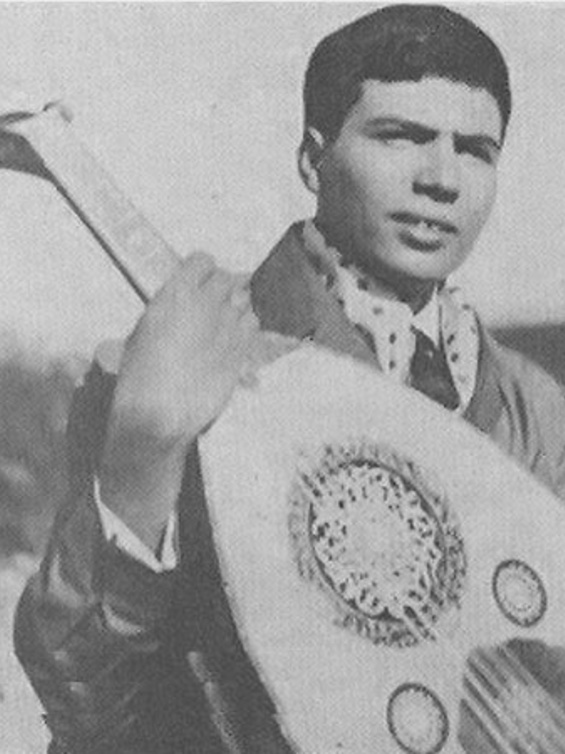
Young Abu Bakr Salem holding an oud

Abu Bakr was born on 17 March 1939, in Tarim, a town situated in Wadi Hadhramaut in eastern Yemen. His family was from the Ba 'Alawi sada. After his father died he was raised by his mother, grandfather, and uncles. His grandfather Abdel Rahman Bilfaqih was a poet in Hadhramaut.

While he was a teenager he was asked to perform the Adhan (the call to prayer) in mosques in Tarim. When he became insightful about both poetry and Islamic studies. When he was 17 years old he wrote his first poem: 'You are the most beautiful among all roses'. In his 20s, he started singing Nasheeds and Moashahs locally. He brought together all the poems that he turned into songs into one book that he called "A poet First, a Singer Afterwards." He started composing folk songs when he moved from Tarim to Aden which at the time was experiencing a cultural and musical boom, home to rising artists such as the Yemeni poet Lutfi Jafar Iman, and the singers Ahmed Bin Ahmed Qasim and Muhammad Saad Abdullah.

He studied at a teachers' institute in Yemen. He also worked as a teacher for three years, drawing on his training at a teachers' institute, before shifting to the art scene.

== Career ==
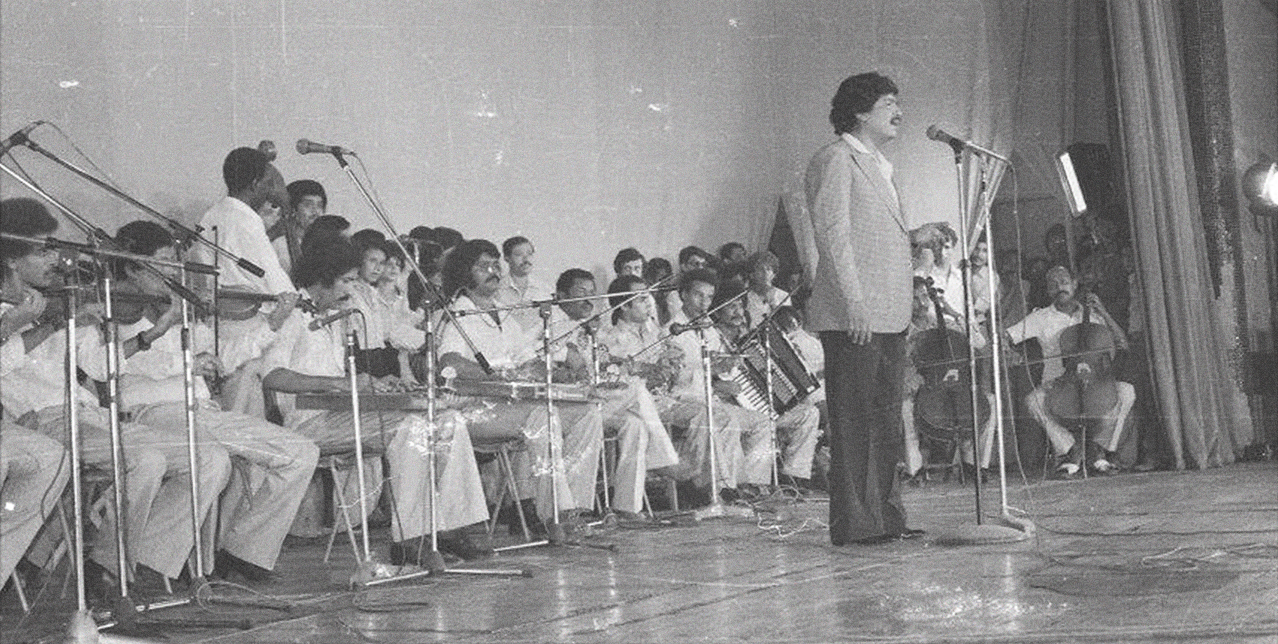
Abu Bakr Salem performing on the stage of the National Theater of Aden in 1982

Before drawing his path in the music world, Abu Bakr worked as a teacher for three years.

Abu Bakr began singing at organized parties and events and performed on Aden TV. In 1956, he made his big hit through a broadcast with his first song using his first poem Ya Ward Mahla Jamalak.

Later in his career, Abu Bakr brought together all the poems that he turned into songs into one book that he called A Poet First, a Singer Afterwards. Inspired by the amount of positive feedback that he received after his first appearance on TV and after his hit on the broadcast in Aden, Abu Bakr dedicated two years of hard work to focus on his music career. Within these two years, he regularly released songs including Lima Alqee Al Habib, Khaf Rabek, Ya habib, and Ya Kahef Al Rouh.

Abu Bakr Salem singing Dhabi al-Yaman during an interview with Aden Television, 1982

In 1958, Abu Bakr left to Beirut to find more opportunities as it had a well-established regional music hub through its plethora of performance venues, radio stations, and well-designed recording studios. He released a series of popular singles such as 24 Saa'ah (24 hours) which sold more than one million copies and became a hit in the Arab world in a relatively short time. It is still considered one of the classics of the Arabic music Tarab genre. Abu Bakr fled Beirut when the Lebanese Civil War broke out in 1975.

After leaving Beirut, Abu Bakr settled in the capital city of Saudi Arabia, Riyadh. In Saudi Arabia, the Yemeni poet Hussein Al-Mehdhar wrote most of Abu Bakr's greatest songs and in return, Abu Bakr sang Hussein's compositions. Abu Bakr held concerts across the Gulf countries, drawing large crowds.

== Honors and awards ==
- 1968 - He received Greece's golden disc award for his album Mata Ana Ashoufak (When Shall I See You).
- 1978 - He was ranked as the third best voice in the world in a contest organized by UNESCO.
- 1985 - He sang at the Albert Hall in London and the concert was organized by the Government of Oman and the Omani Sapcon Company for Arts and Literature 1 November 1985
- 1989 - He was awarded the first degree art medallion from the Yemeni president Ali Abdullah Saleh .
- 1992 - He was granted an Appreciation and Excellence medallion from the Omani Ministry of National Herite.
- 1999 - He won a prize for best singing performance at Abha Touristic Festival in 1999.
- 1999 - He was granted another Appreciation medallion from the UAE song festival and an Appreciation certificate for his art accomplishments at the Gulf Song Festival.
- 2001 - He was honoured by the King of Bahrain decoration of first class arts and literature
- 2002 - The Arab League honored him along with other Arab art pioneers.
- 2003 - He won the UNESCO Prize as the second best voice in the world and the cultural medal in 2003.
- 2003 - The University of Hadhramout awarded Abu Bakr an honorary doctorate degree.
- 2014 - He was honoured by Sultan Qaboos Sultan of Oman decoration first class arts and literature.

== Family ==
Abu Bakr was married to two women both of Yemeni origin. He had six children, 4 males and 2 females, from both his wives. Both his daughters and oldest son, Adib, were from his first marriage. While his youngest three sons, Aseel, Ahmad and Alif, were from his second marriage.

His son Aseel Abu Bakr Salem followed his steps and he made a strong entrance to the world of Khaleeji music when he joined his father in the song "A Sun Between You and Me." The song immediately became a hit and remained at the top of charts for a time.

== Illness and death ==
Abu Bakr suffered from health problems for the last ten years of his life. He had an open heart surgery and suffered a kidney failure when he was being treated in Munich, Germany. He was admitted in a clinic for several months afterwards. He also went at intermittent periods to King Faisal Specialist Hospital in Riyadh, Saudi Arabia. His last public appearance was on the Saudi National Day celebration at the Red Sea city of Jeddah in September 2017. He was not able to continue singing, however, due to his long-term illness. He died three months later on 10 December 2017, at the age of 78 years.
