= El General (rapper) =

Tunisian rapper and songwriter (born 1989)

El General الجنرال
- Born: Hamada Ben Amor; October 7, 1989 (age 36); Sfax, Tunisia
- Genres: Hip hop; political hip hop; Arabic hip hop
- Occupations: Rapper; singer; songwriter
- Instrument: Vocals
- Years active: 2007–present

Hamada Ben Amor (حمادة بن عمر; born 7 October 1989), known by the stage name El General (الجنرال; also written El Général), is a Tunisian rapper whose protest songs became widely associated with the early phase of the Tunisian revolution of 2010–2011.

His song "Rais Lebled" has been described by international media as an "anthem" or "battle hymn" of the uprising that led to the fall of President Zine El Abidine Ben Ali. During the protests he was detained by Tunisian authorities, prompting international press-freedom and news coverage.

== Early life ==
Ben Amor grew up in Sfax in a middle-class family. His mother ran a bookshop and his father worked as a hospital medic. He studied medicine.

== Career ==
=== 2007–2010: Underground releases and censorship ===
Ben Amor has been making mainly political rap songs since 2007. The songs were previously kept underground by the strict censorship of the autocratic regime of Tunisian president Zine El Abidine Ben Ali. On December 24, 2010, two days after his second famous protest song "Tunisia Our Country" was released on YouTube and Facebook and one week after the protests in Tunisia began, he was arrested by Tunisian police. Three days later, Ben Amor was released, after being forced to sign a statement to no longer make any political songs.

=== 2010–2011: Tunisian revolution and detention ===
In late 2010, Ben Amor posted the protest track "Rais Lebled" online.

Ben Amor's “President of the Country,” a searing Arabic rap song, served as a soundtrack for the revolution. The week before Mohamed Bouazizi’s death, Hamada Ben Amor used a handheld camera to tape himself singing the song, a baseball cap pulled over his eyes. “Mr. President,” he exclaimed, “your people are dead!” Al Jazeera and various social media picked up the video. The secret police arrested Ben Amor, inflaming his followers, and hastening Ben Ali’s exit. Following public backlash, Ben Amor was released after several days.

After the overthrow of Ben Ali, his songs enjoyed enormous popularity in Tunisia, particularly "Rais Lebled" which became known as the anthem of the revolution and gained him international recognition.

== Artistry ==
Ben Amor's lyrics have focused on unemployment, corruption, and police abuse.

== Discography ==
=== Singles and notable songs ===
Year	Title	Type	Notes
2010	Rais Lebled ("Head/President of the Country")	Single	Protest track circulated via social media and widely described in international media as an anthem of the Tunisian uprising.
2010	Tounes Bledna ("Tunisia Our Country")	Single	Released during the early phase of the uprising and discussed in coverage of his detention and the spread of protest music online.
2011	Tahia Tounes ("Vive Tunisie!")	Single	Reported as written after his detention, as a tribute to those killed during the uprising and a solidarity message to protesters elsewhere in the region.

=== Compilation appearances ===
Year	Title	Role	Notes
2013	The Rough Guide to Arabic Revolution (World Music Network)	Contributing artist	Included the track "State of the Nation" (credited to El General, featuring Mr Shooma) as part of a compilation of protest music from the Arab uprisings.
