= Hussein Moheb =

Yemeni singer

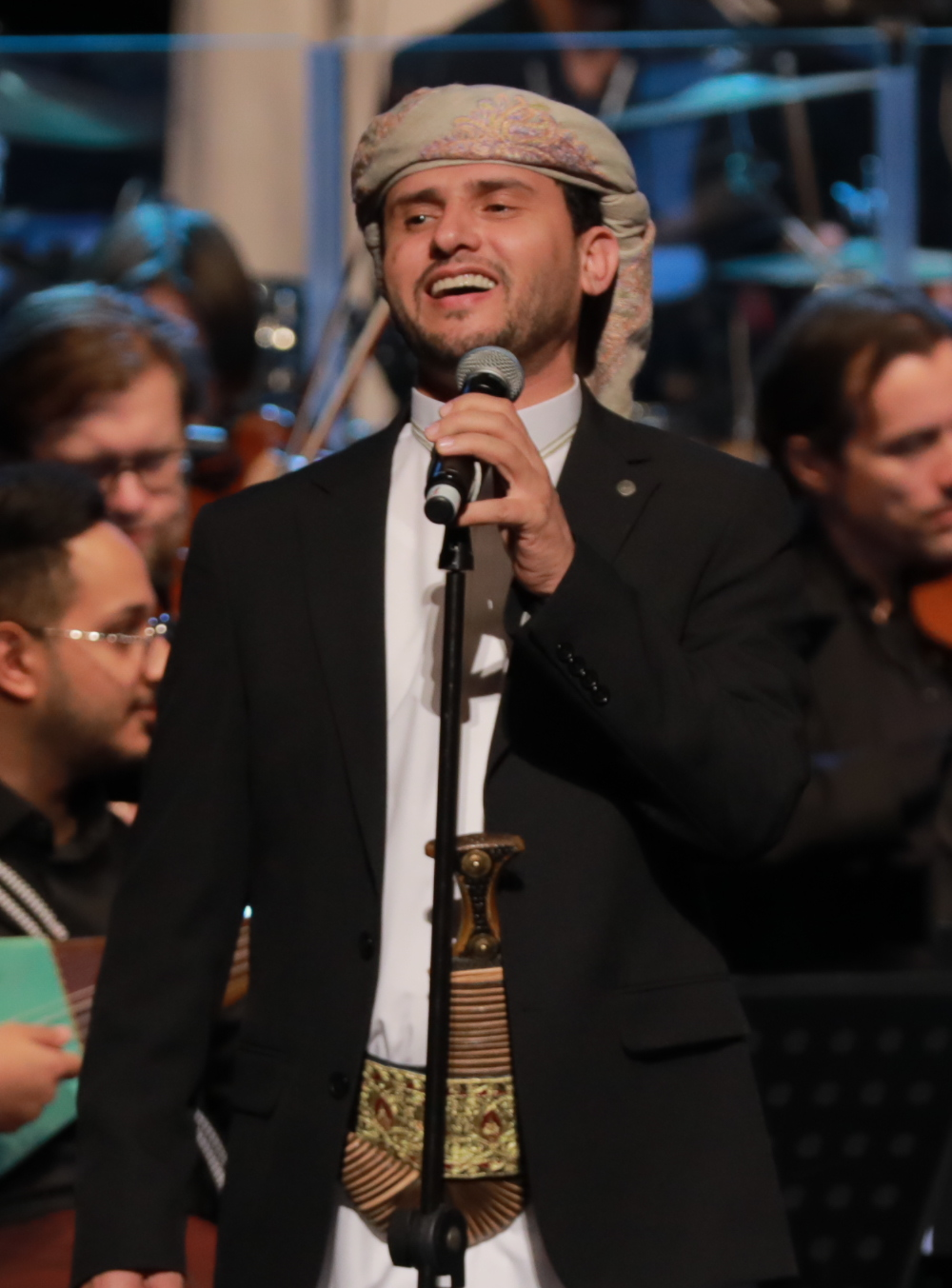

Background information
- Born: 1985 (age 39–40); Hamdan District, Sana'a
- Genres: Yemeni music
- Occupation: Singer
- Years active: 2000–present

Moheb performing Khatar Ghusn Al-Qana in a concert organized by Heritage Symphonies

Hussein Moheb (Arabic: حسين محب) is a well-known Yemeni singer. He was born in 1985 in Hamdan District, Sana'a, and started singing in 2000.
