= Ahmed Fathi =

Ahmed Fathi احمد فتحي
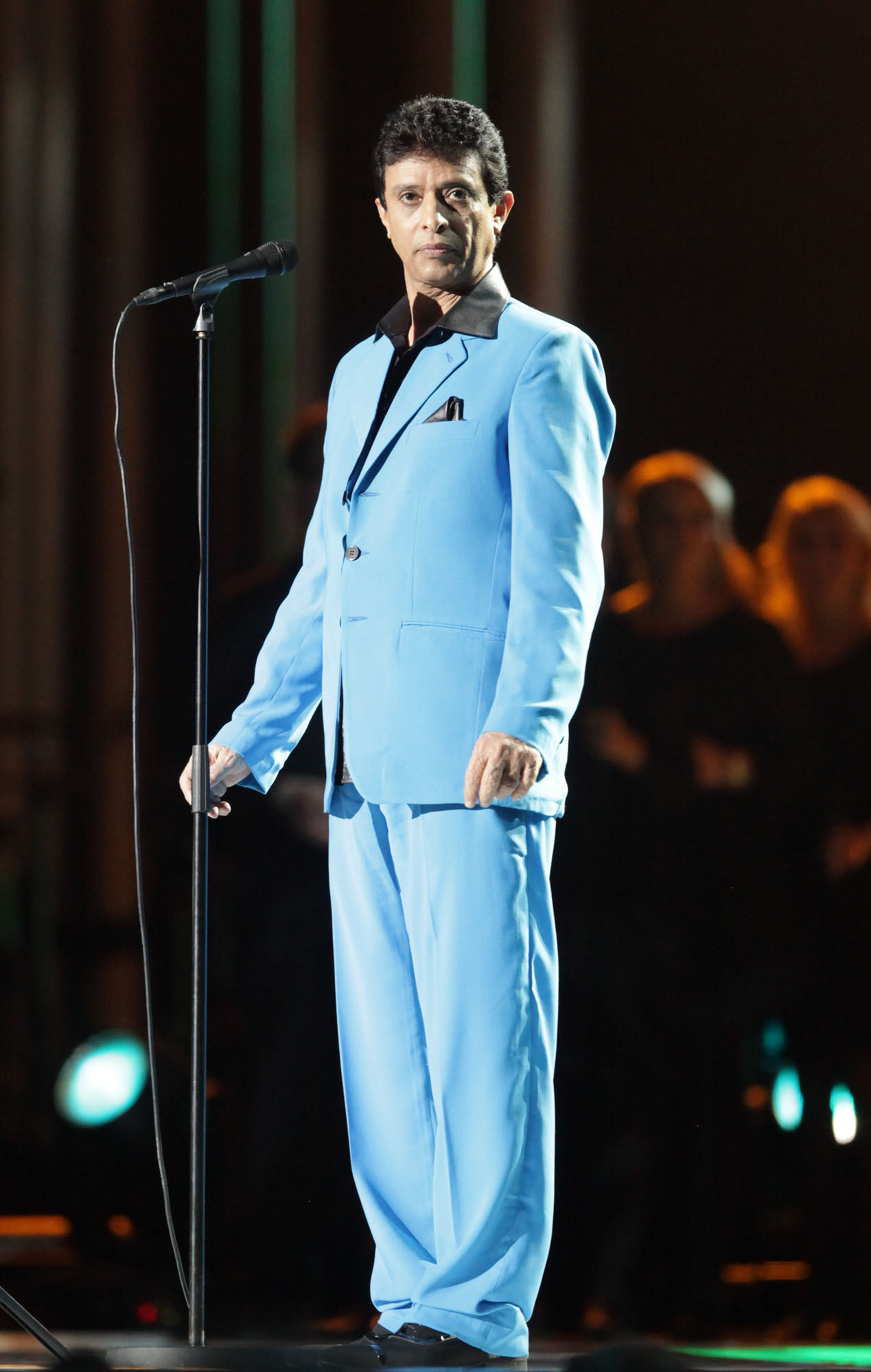

Background information
- Born: 1957 (age 68–69); Ad-Dahi, Kingdom of Yemen
- Genres: Yemeni music
- Instrument: Oud

Ahmed Fathi (Arabic: احمد فتحي) is a Yemeni musician, composer and singer. Born in the city of Al Hudaydah to the west of Yemen in 1957. He emigrated to Egypt for study. Fathi received a master's degree from the Arab Music High Institute in Egypt for his thesis "The Role of the Lute in the Yemeni Singing" in 1998. He also got an Honorary PhD. from Hodeidah University in 2006. He is the father of the singer Balqees.

== Early childhood ==
In his early childhood, Ahmed Fathi showed his lute playing talent but his conservative family stood against him. His father broke his son's lute many times but he didn't give up. He made his own music instruments. In a party held in Alhoodeida in the year 1967, he met the Aden star Ahmed Qasim who praised his talent and asked him to come to Aden so that he could help him polish his skill. Ahmed Fathi left his home secretly and went to Aden where he received free lessons from the musician. Later, in a school party, the Minister of Education Ahmed Jaber Afif was impressed by Fathi's talent and awarded him a scholarship to study music at the Arab Music High Institute in Cairo.

== Albums ==
- Ekhtelaf (differences) horses production company
- (Abu Zeid) the production of Al Jazeera Production
- Shagel Alkhater (Mind occupying) produced by Rotana Mousica
- Habibi Ta'ala (My Love please come) produced by Rotana Mousica
- Ana lak (I'm yours) produced by Rotana Mousica
- Akher Alakhbar (News) produced by Rotana Mousica

== Awards and participations ==
Fathi was awarded many prizes for being the best lute performer in many festivals all over the world. These festivals include:

- The Arab Music Festival (1994, 1998) in the Cairo Opera House
- Arab lute Festival Sultanate Oman, 2005
- Doha Festival in January, 2006
- He was honored in "Sanaa" in Yemen in 2004
- Dubai Festival in 1998
- Najran Festival in 2003
- Jenadriyah Festival in 2004
- Nobel Celebration, 2011
