= Al-Saqqaf =

Al-Saqqaf (Arabic: السقاف), also spelled Al Saqqaf, al-Sagoff, Al-Sakkaf, Al-Saqqaf, Alsaggaf, Alsagoff, Assegaf, Assegaff, Saggaf, or Sakkaf, can be both a masculine given name and a surname. Notable people with the surname include:

== Given name ==
- Saggaf bin Muhammad Aljufri (1937–2021), Indonesian Islamic Scholar

== Surname ==
- Nadia Al-Sakkaf (born 1977), Yemeni minister and politician
- Muhammad M. Al-Saggaf, Saudi Arabian university president
- Abdulaziz Al-Saqqaf (1951–1999), Yemeni activist and journalist
- Abdul-Hafez al-Saqqaf, Yemeni military officer
- Abdul-Wasa Al-Saqqaf, Yemeni writer
- Ahmad bin Abdullah Al Saqqaf (1882–1949), Yemeni novelist
- Omar Al Saqqaf (1923–1974), Saudi Arabian politician and diplomat
- Samar Alsaggaf (born 1964), Saudi Arabian anatomist
- Syed Abdul Rahman Alsagoff, Singaporean businessman and philanthropist
- Abu Bakar bin Taha Alsagoff, Singaporean educator
- Syed Mohamed bin Ahmad Alsagoff (fl. 1960s), Singaporean military commander
- Syed Mohamed bin Ahmed Alsagoff (1836–1906), Singaporean civil servant
- Iqbal Assegaf (1957–1999), Indonesian activist
- Nurhayati Ali Assegaf, Indonesian politician
- Omar Daniel Assegaf, Indonesian actor
- Haddad Alwi Assegaff (born 1966), Indonesian singer and actor
- Fajar Sakkaf (born 2008), Saudi football goalkeeper

== See also ==
- House of al-Sagoff, Hadhrami Arab family
