= Hadharem =

Ethnic division of Arabs

الحضارم (Arabic)
- Map of Hadhramaut and the Hadharem diaspora regions

Regions with significant populations
- Arabian Peninsula, East Africa, Southeast Asia: Yemen (mainland); Saudi Arabia; Oman; Kuwait; UAE; Indonesia; Malaysia; Singapore; Sudan; Ethiopia; Somalia; Kenya; Comoros; Tanzania (Zanzibar); India; United States; United Kingdom

Languages
- Hadhrami Arabic, historically Hadramautic

Religion
- Sunni Islam, mainly Shafi'i

Related ethnic groups
- Other Arabs, other Old South Arabian-speaking peoples, Lembas, Chaush, Sri Lankan Moors, Sodagar, Konkani Muslims, Nawayath, Malabar Muslims, Surti Sunni Vohras, Artega, Arab Indonesians

The Hadharem (Arabic: حضارم, romanized: ḥaḍārim; singular: Hadhrami, Arabic: حضرمي, romanized: ḥaḍramī) are an Arab ethnographic group indigenous to the Hadhramaut region in the Arabian Peninsula, which is part of modern-day Yemen, southern Oman, and southern Saudi Arabia. The spoken language of the Hadharem is Hadhrami Arabic. Among the two million inhabitants of Hadhramaut, there are about 1,300 distinct tribes.

== Society ==
Flag of Hadhramaut designed by Qasimists

Hadhramaut was under Muslim rule and converted to the faith during the time of Prophet Muhammad. A religious leader from Iraq introduced the Hadharem to Ibadi Islam in the mid-eighth century until in 951 AD when Sunnis took Hadhramaut and put it under their domain. To this day the Hadharem follow Sunni Islam, specifically the Shafi'i school.

=== Social hierarchy ===
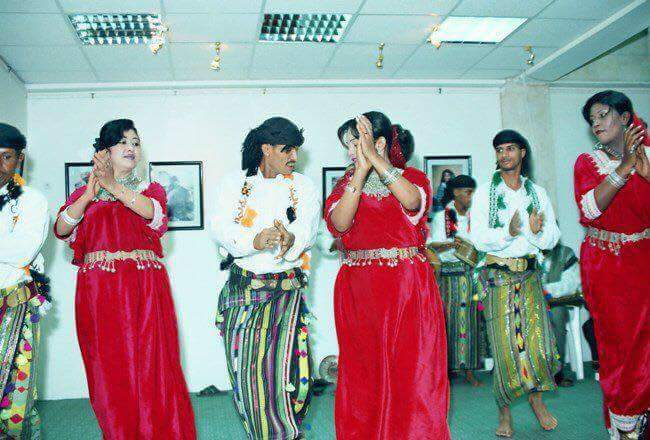
Hadharem in Hadhrami attire performing a traditional dance

The people of the region are known as the Hadharem, generally belong to the Semitic south Arabians who claim descent from Yarub bin Qahtan. There is, however, a large number of Sada (Hadrami Arabic: سادة, romanized: Sadah; Singular: Sayyid), or descendant of the Islamic Prophet Muhammad, and of townsmen of northern origin, besides a considerable class of African or mixed descent. The Sada, descendants of Husain ibn Ali, grandson of the Islamic Prophet, form a numerous and highly respected aristocracy. They are divided into families, the chiefs of which are known as Munsibs, who are looked on as the religious leaders of the people and are even, in some cases are regarded with great respect as saints. Among the leading families are that of Sheikh Abu Bakar bin Salem (Hadrami Arabic: الشيخ ابو بكر بن سالم) of ʽAynat, al-Aidarus (Hadrami Arabic: العيدروس) of Shihr and Wadi Dawan, Bin Sumayt (Hadrami Arabic: بن سميط) of Shibam and the Sakkaf (Hadrami Arabic: سقاف) of Seiyun. They do not bear arms, nor occupy themselves in trade, nor manual labour, nor even agriculture; though owning a large proportion of the land, they employ labourers to cultivate it. As compared with the other classes, they are well educated and are strict in their observance of religious duties, and owing to the respect due to their descent, they exercise a strong influence both in temporal and spiritual affairs.

The Mashayikh (Hadrami Arabic: المشايخ) is another highly regarded group that is second in prestige to the Sada. Like the Sada, they don't bear arms. Men from this group are given the honorific surname Sheikh (Hadrami Arabic: شيخ) and women are given the surname Sheikha (Hadrami Arabic: شيخة) which is different from the term Sheikh (Arabic: شيخ) that is used to refer to a tribal chief or a Muslim scholar. Prominent Mashayikh families include the ‘Amudi (Hadrami Arabic: العمودي), Ba Wazir (Hadrami Arabic: با وزير), and Ba ‘Abbad (Hadrami Arabic: با عبّاد) families.

The Qaba'il (Hadrami Arabic: القبائل) or tribesmen, as in the rest of Arabia, are the predominant class in the population. All the adults carry arms. Some of the tribes have settled towns and villages, others live a bedouin life, keeping however within the territory which is recognised as belonging to the tribe. They are divided into sections or families, each headed by a chief while the head of the tribe is called the muqaddam or sultan. He is the leader in peace and in war, but the tribesmen are not his subjects; he can only rule with their support. Historically, the most powerful tribes in Hadhramaut was the Qu’aiti, a branch of the Yafa'a tribe. Originally invited by the Sada to protect the settled districts against the marauding tribes, they established themselves as rulers of the country, and possessed the coastal districts with the towns of Mukalla and Shihr as well as Shibam in the interior. The family had accumulated great wealth and was in the service of the Nizam of Hyderabad in India as commander of the Arab levy composed of his tribesmen.

The townsmen are the free inhabitants of the towns and villages as distinguished from the Sada and the tribesmen; they do not carry arms, but are the working members of the community, merchants, artificers, cultivators, and servants and are entirely dependent on the tribes and chiefs under whose protection they live. The servile class contains a large African element, brought over formerly when the slave trade nourished on this coast.

== Language ==
The Hadharem speak Hadhrami Arabic, a dialect of Arabic, although Hadharem living in the diaspora that have acculturated mainly speak the local language of the region they live in.

== Diaspora ==
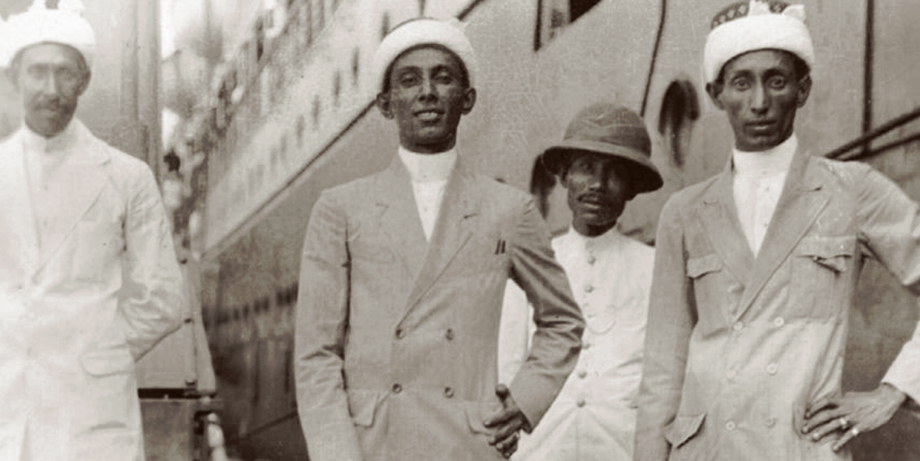
Hadhrami immigrants in Surabaya (Indonesia), 1920

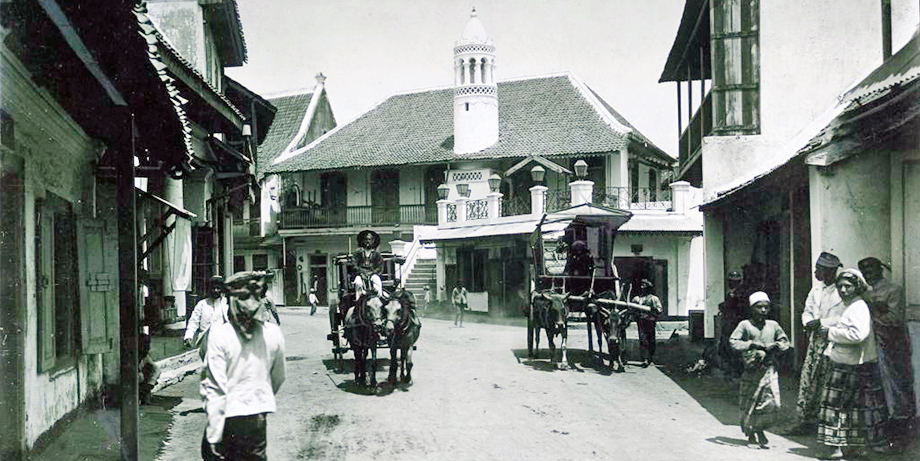
Hadhrami Arab neighborhood in Surabaya, 1880

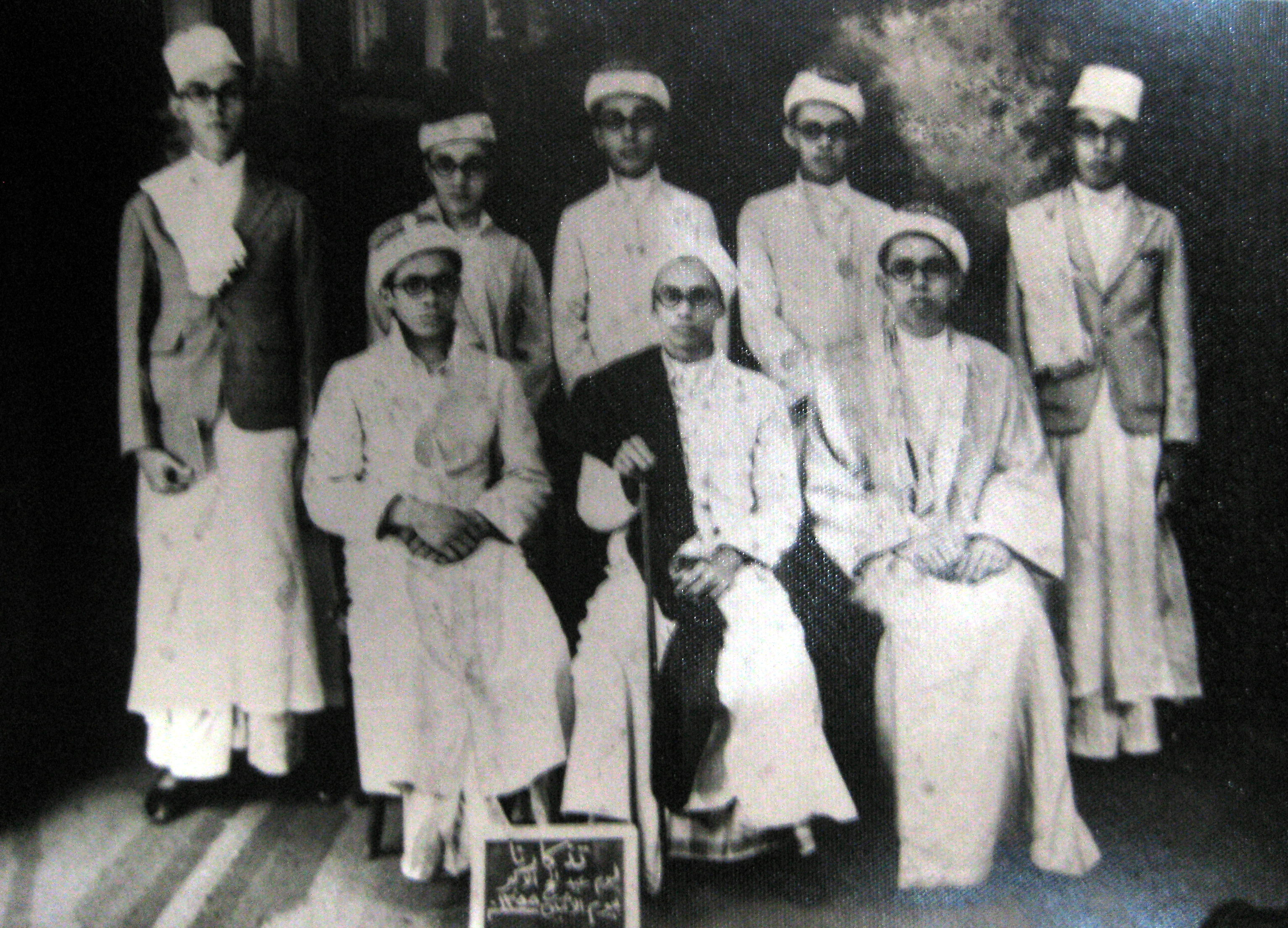
Hadharem of Palembang, 22 February 1937

The Hadharem have a long seafaring and trading tradition that predates Semitic cultures. Hadramite influence was later overshadowed by the rise of the Sabaeans, who became the ruling class. This prompted Hadhrami families to emigrate in large numbers around the Indian Ocean basin, including the Horn of Africa, the Swahili Coast, the Malabar Coast, Hyderabad in South India, Sri Lanka, and Maritime Southeast Asia. In the mid 1930s the Hadhrami Diaspora numbered at 110,000, amounting to a third of the total Hadhrami population.

=== Hadharem in the Arabian Peninsula ===
Hadharami communities exist in western Yemen, the trading ports of the Arab states of the Persian Gulf, and on the coast of the Red Sea. The money changers in Jeddah, Saudi Arabia have historically been of Hadhrami origin.

=== Hadhrami East Africans ===
The Hadharem have long had a presence in the Horn of Africa (Djibouti, Ethiopia and Somalia), and also comprise a notable part of the Harari population. Hadhrami settlers were instrumental in helping to consolidate the Muslim community in the coastal Benadir province of Somalia, in particular. During the colonial period, disgruntled Hadharem from the tribal wars settled in various Somali towns. They were also frequently recruited into the armies of the Somali Sultanates.

Some Hadhrami communities also reportedly exist in Mozambique, Comoros, and Madagascar.

=== Hadhrami Jews ===
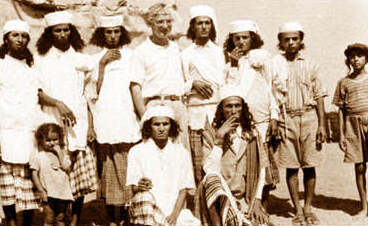
Hadhrami Jewish men in Coastal Hadhrami attire

The vast majority of the Hadhrami Jews now live in Israel.

=== List of Hadhrami Diaspora ===
- Sri Lankan Moors
- Arab Filipino
- Arab Indonesian
- Arab Malaysian
- Arab Singaporean
- Chaush, India
- Sodagar (Gujarati Shaikh)
- Konkani Muslims of the Konkani division of Maharashtra (partially)
- Nawayath, of Maharashtra, Goa and Karnataka, India; Barkas, Hyderabad, India
- Mappila of Kerala, India
- Hadhrami Jews in Israel and abroad
- The Surti Sunni Vohra Community in Gujarat that are partially of Hadhrami descent
- Lemba people (Sena) who are of paternal Yemeni ancestry via Hadhramautic settlers in South East Africa; These Hadhrami settlers were primarily from the city of Sana.

== Notable people ==
=== Yemen ===
- Mohammed A. Al-Hadhrami, former Foreign Minister of the Republic of Yemen (2019-2020)
- Abd Al-Rahman Ali Al-Jifri, politician
- Abdulaziz Al-Saqqaf, human-rights activist
- Faisal Bin Shamlan, politician
- Habib Ali al-Jifri, Islamic scholar
- Habib Umar bin Hafiz, Islamic scholar
- Habib Abdullah bin Alwi al-Haddad, Sufi saint
- Imam Muhammad al-Faqih Muqaddam, founder of Ba'alawi Sufi order
- Sayyid Abu Bakr Al-Aidarus (saint)

=== Swahili Coast ===
- Awadh Saleh Sherman, Kenya, businessman
- Najib Balala, Kenya, former Minister of Tourism
- Ahmed Abdallah Mohamed Sambi, former President of Comoros
- Habib Salih, Lamu, Kenya, religious scholar
- Khadija Abdalla Bajaber, Mombasa, Kenya, poet and novelist

=== Horn of Africa ===
- Mohammed Al Amoudi, Ethiopia, businessman

=== Indonesia ===
- Abdurrahman Baswedan, Journalist
- Abdurrahman Shihab, Academic and Politician
- Najwa Shihab, Journalist and tv presenter
- Abu Bakar Bashir, founder of Jamaah Islamiyah
- Ali Alatas, former Foreign Minister
- Ahmad bin Abdullah Al Saqqaf, novelist and poet
- Alwi Shihab, former Foreign Minister, special envoy to Middle East and OIC
- Anies Baswedan, scholar, former Education Minister, Governor of Jakarta (2017-2022)
- Fadel Muhammad al-Haddar, former Minister of Maritime Affairs and Fisheries
- Fuad Hassan, Minister of Education and Culture
- Hamid Algadri, a figure in Indonesian National Revolution and member of parliament
- Sultan Hamid II, Pontianak Sultanate
- Habib Abdoe'r Rahman Alzahier, religious leader
- Habib Ali al-Habshi of Kwitang, religious leader
- Habib Munzir Al-Musawa, Islamic cleric
- Habib Rizieq Shihab, founder of FPI
- Habib Usman bin Yahya, Mufti of Batavia
- Jafar Umar Thalib, founder of Laskar Jihad
- Munir Said Thalib Al-Kathiri, human rights activist
- Nuruddin ar-Raniri, Islamic scholar
- Quraish Shihab, Islamic scholar
- Raden Saleh, Artist/painter
- Said Naum, a philanthropist
- Sayyid Abdullah Al-Aidarus, religious leader
- Andi Soraya, Actress
- Ahmad Albar, Musician

=== East Timor ===
- Mari Alkatiri, former Prime Minister

=== Malaysia ===
- Habib Alwi bin Thahir al-Haddad, former Mufti of Johor Bahru
- Syed Muhammad Naquib al-Attas, philosopher
- Syed Hussein Alatas, politician and sociologist
- Abdullah bin Abdul Kadir, writer
- Syed Hamid Albar, politician
- Syed Jaafar Albar, politician
- Syed Sheh Hassan Barakbah, judge
- Syarif Masahor, warrior
- Syed Mokhtar Al-Bukhary businessman
- Syed Nasir Ismail, politician
- Tun Habib Abdul Majid, Grand Vizier
- Zeti Akhtar Aziz, former governor of Central Bank
- House of Jamalullail (Perak)
- House of Jamalullail (Perlis)
- Syed Saddiq, politician

=== Singapore ===
The Hadharem presence in Singapore came from encouragement of Stamford Raffles to trade in his newly established colony of Singapore.

- Alsagoff family
- Syed Abdul Rahman Alsagoff, merchant
- Syed Mohamed Alsagoff, military leader
- Syed Sharif Omar bin Ali Al Junied, merchant and namesake of Aljunied Road

=== South Asia ===
- Ahmed Bin Abdullah Balala, Indian politician
- Ahmed Abdullah Masdoosi, Indian activist and lawyer
- Nuruddin ar-Raniri, Indian Islamic scholar
- Subhani ba Yunus, Pakistani actor
- Syed Ahmed El Edroos, Indian Army general of Hyderabad
- Sayyid Farooq al-Aydarus, Bangladeshi politician and army officer
- Sulaiman Areeb, Indian poet
- Awaz Sayeed, Indian Urdu writer and poet from Hyderabad
- Ausaf Sayeed, Indian Ambassador, Diplomat and scholar from Hyderabad

=== Saudi Arabia ===
- Bin Laden family
- Mohammed Al Amoudi, businessman
- Khalid bin Mahfouz
- Omar Al Saqqaf, Diplomat

=== United Kingdom ===
- Shatha Altowai, visual artist, painter
- Saber Bamatraf, Yemeni pianist, composer, and cultural activist.

== See also ==
- Hadhramout Region
- Arab Indonesians
- Hadrami sheikhdom
- History of the Jews in Hadramaut
- Ibn Khaldun al-Hadrami
- Lemba people
- Yemenite Jews
