= Syed Mohamed bin Ahmad Alsagoff =

Malaysian general

Syed Mohamed bin Syed Ahmad Alsagoff (Arabic: سيد محمد بن سيد أحمد السقاف Sayyid Muḥammad bin Sayyid Aḥmad as-Saqqāf) was an Hadhrami Muslim born in Singapore and grandson of Nong Chik.

Alsagoff was the commander of the Malaysian Armed Forces based in Singapore from 1963 to 1965. After Singapore's separation from Malaysia, fears arose that Alsagoff might stage a coup, causing Lee and his family to move to a guarded residence. Alsagoff, known for his sense of humor, was a respected figure who enjoyed instilling fear in his subordinates. He retired in the 1970s.

== Early life and education ==
He was educated at Victoria School and later joined the Malayan Armed Forces, the predecessor of the Malaysian Armed Forces. He rose to the rank of major-general before his retirement in the 1970s. His father was Dato Syed Ahmad bin Mohammad Alsagoff (A.M. Alsagoff), a renowned philanthropist who also brought the Boy Scout movement and St. John's Ambulance brigade to Singapore and was a son of Nong Chik.

When Singapore was part of Malaysia from 1963 to 1965, he was the commander of the Malaysian armed forces based in Singapore, holding the rank of brigadier. The Malaysian armed forces consist of the 4th Malaysian Infantry Brigade which has two infantry regiments of about 1000 soldiers each. The forces moved out of Singapore completely in November, 1967.

== Modernization of Singapore Armed Forces ==
Singapore's first prime minister, Lee Kuan Yew, revealed that it was Brigadier Alsagoff who was instrumental in prompting him to embark on an ambitious plan to modernise the Singapore Armed Forces.

In his memoirs, From Third World to First: The Singapore Story (ISBN 0060197765), Lee stated that he had taken offence that Brigadier Syed Mohamed had "insisted" that his Malaysian motorcycle outriders escort him from his City Hall office to Parliament House for the ceremonial opening of the first Parliament of Singapore.

Lee was also fearful that Brigadier Alsagoff might be persuaded by Syed Ja'afar Albar to stage a coup months after Singapore's separation from Malaysia. Brigadier Alsagoff with his brigade based in Singapore could have easily captured him and his ministers. Lee and his family eventually moved from their family home to the Istana guarded by a company of Gurkha guards. It was rumoured that then Brig. General Syed Mohammad jokingly told Lee Kuan Yew in private that he could have had him arrested and shot and kept Singapore for himself. Lee Kuan Yew didn't take too kindly to this and systematically dismantled the properties and holdings of the Alsagoff family in Singapore through the acquisition of land via the Urban Renewal Act. The whole of Geylang Serai, then known as The Perseverance Estate - a 50-acre plot of land - also was acquired via the URA for a measly $260,000 in the late 70's.

Syed Ja'afar Albar had strongly opposed Singapore's separation from Malaysia, and had resigned as UMNO secretary-general in protest.

However, one of Alsagoff's former subordinates, Lt-Col Fathol Zaman Bukhari (Arabic: فتح الزمان البخاري Fatḥ az-Zamān al-Bukhārī), stated that Alsagoff was a jovial, larger-than-life figure who liked to instil fear in his subordinates; and that Lee would not have acted so impetuously if he had known Alsagoff's sense of humour. He retired as a Major General and was fondly known as "Siapa Raja" or Who Is King.

== Books ==
From Third World to First: The Singapore Story (ISBN 0060197765)

== See also ==
- Arab Singaporeans
- Alsagoff family
- Sayyid
