= Masjid Hajjah Fatimah =

Historic mosque in Kampong Glam, Singapore

Hajjah Fatimah Mosque Masjid Hajjah Fatimah (مسجد الحاجة فاطمة)
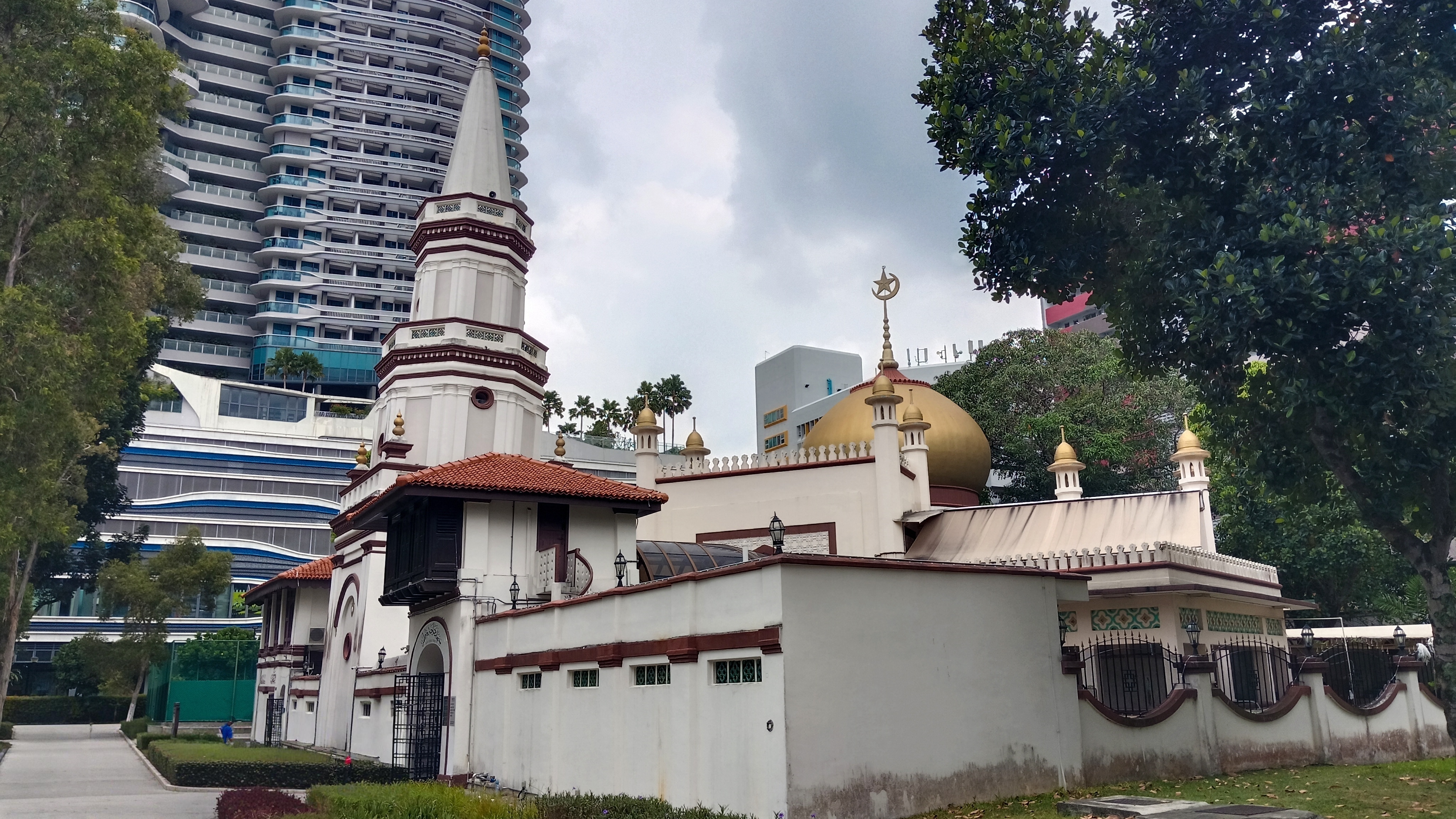

- Location in Singapore

Religion
- Affiliation: Sunni Islam

Location
- Location: 4001 Beach Road, Singapore 199584
- Country: Singapore
- Coordinates: 1.3028318°N 103.8629145°E

Architecture
- Type: Mosque, mausoleum, steeple
- Style: Eclectic
- Founder: Fatimah binte Sulaiman
- Completed: c. 1845

Specifications
- Dome: 1
- Minaret: 1
- Spire: 1
- Designated as NHL

National monument of Singapore
- Designated: 28 June 1973; 53 years ago
- Reference no.: 7

The Hajjah Fatimah Mosque is a historic mosque situated along Beach Road in the Kampong Glam district of Rochor, Singapore. It was built in the 1840s by a Muslim noblewoman named Hajjah Fatimah. The mosque is now a national monument of Singapore and is recognizable for its sloped minaret that resembles the steeple of a church.

== History ==
The Hajjah Fatimah Mosque was built between 1845 and 1846 with funding from Hajjah Fatimah, a Malaccan noblewoman whom the mosque was later named after. It took the form of a primarily wooden structure and was rebuilt in concrete in 1920. The main prayer hall of the mosque was rebuilt in the 1930s by French contractor Brossard et Mopin, which hired Malay craftsmen to assist them in the work, while the layout plans of the new hall were designed by Chinese architectural firm Chung & Wong. The mosque was also managed by the Alsagoff family due to them being Hajjah Fatimah's in-laws.

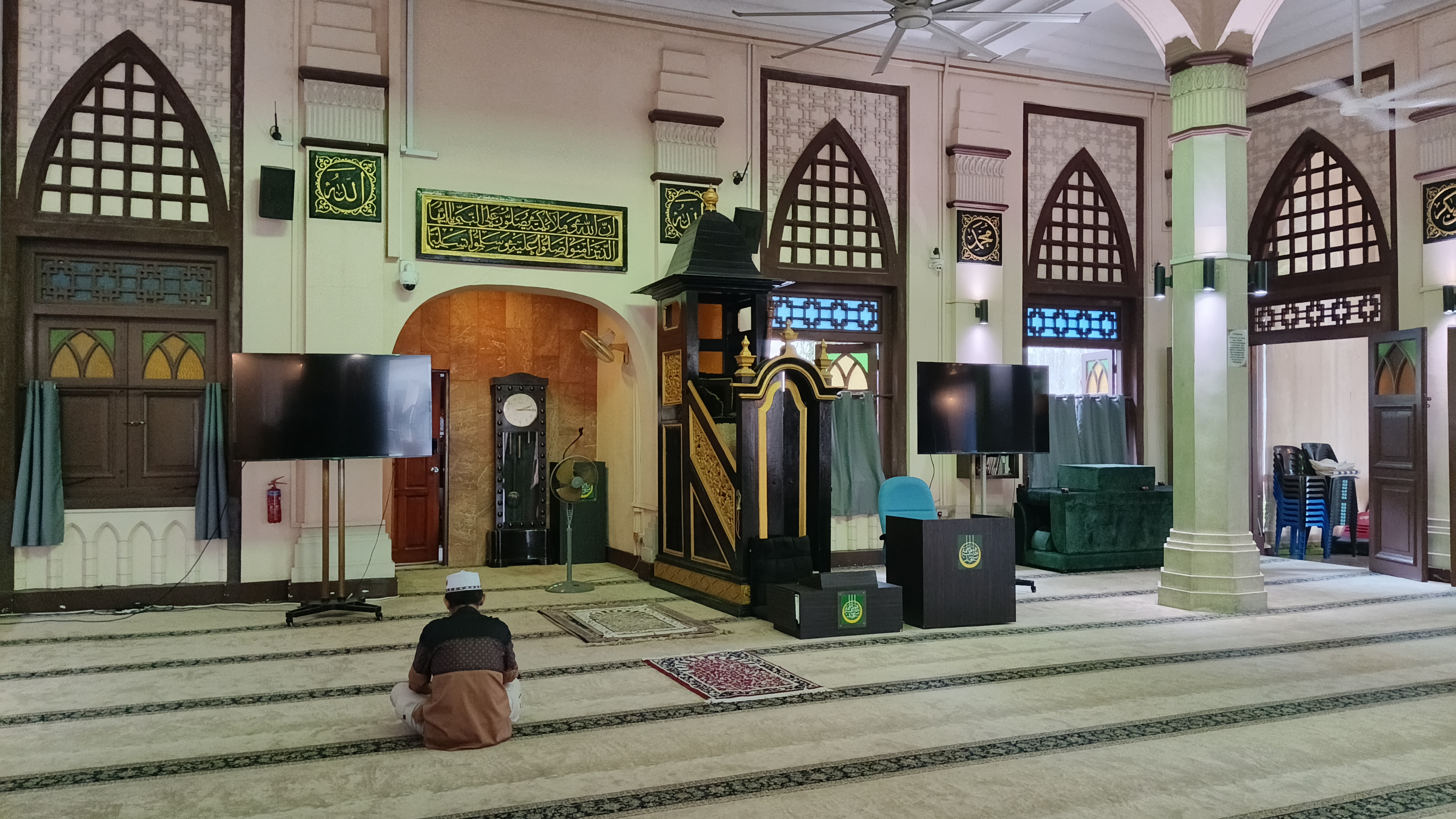
An interior view of the main prayer hall of the mosque, with the minbar (pulpit) visible.

The Hajjah Fatimah Mosque was gazetted as a national monument of Singapore on 28 June 1973 by the National Heritage Board. Restoration works to the structure of the mosque, as well as a complete repainting, were conducted in 1998. In 2021, green waterproofing tiles were installed on the roof of the mosque during minor upgrading works.

== Architecture ==
The exterior of the mosque is designed with eclecticsm, combining architectural styles from Europe with local styles. The bulbous golden dome atop the main prayer hall is derived from Indo-Saracenic architecture, the balconies at the entrance are Moorish in design, while the lancet windows and Doric columns serve as examples of European themes present in the design of the mosque, with Chinese green-glazed tiles adding to the multicultural eclecticism present in the design. The ablution area of the mosque is housed in a small building that is modelled after a traditional Malay house. The structures in the complex are the main prayer hall, ablution area, minaret tower, mausoleum, library and madrasa. The glass window panes in the mosque are imported from Indonesia.

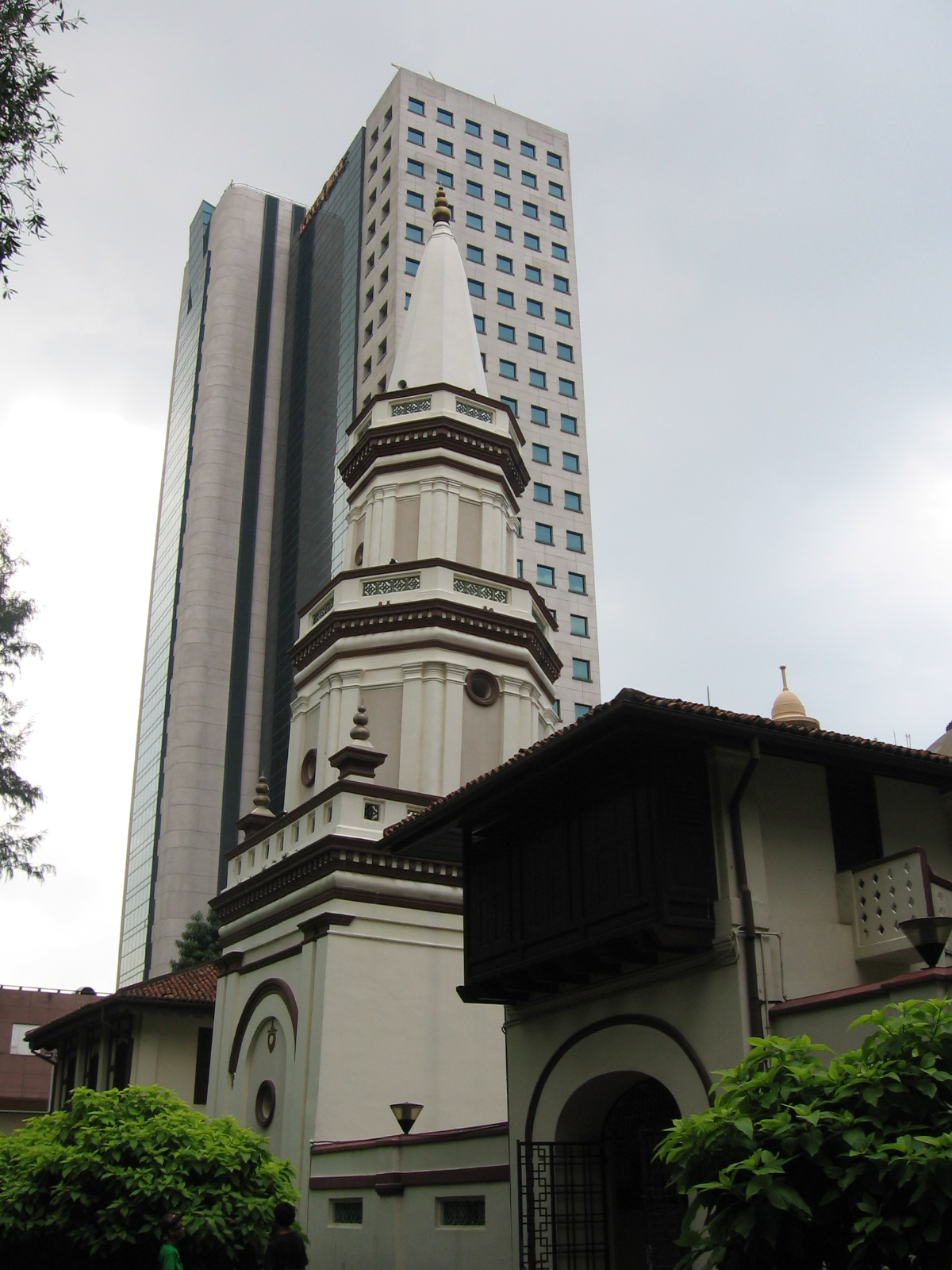
The minaret of the mosque which resembles the steeple of a church.

The minaret of the Hajjah Fatimah Mosque is modelled after the steeple of a church, complete with a spire. Heavy influences from Portuguese architecture are also present in its design. The minaret tilts downwards at an angle of six degrees due to moisture damage as well as vibrations causing the weakened handmade bricks used in its construction to shift from their original positions. Due to the posture of the minaret, comparisons to the Leaning Tower of Pisa have been drawn by locals and tourists alike.

The tombs of Hajjah Fatimah and her daughter Raja Siti are housed in a mausoleum that is situated directly behind the mihrab of the mosque. A second mausoleum also contains the tomb of Syed Mohamed bin Ahmed Alsagoff, grandson of Hajjah Fatimah, as well as his father, who is Hajjah Fatimah's son-in-law. The mausoleums resemble a traditional crypt built in the Portuguese style. There is also a private cemetery for the Alsagoff family within the boundaries of the mosque. In 1973, this cemetery was closed for burials.

== Significance ==
Islamic graves within the compound of the Hajjah Fatimah Mosque.

The Hajjah Fatimah Mosque is culturally significant for its eclectic architecture and the sloped, steeple-like minaret. It also holds historical significance as being one of two mosques in the country to be founded by women and named after their founders, the other being the Khadijah Mosque at Geylang. The death anniversary of Hajjah Fatimah is commemorated at the mosque annually, with an occasional feast being held in her honour. Some locals also revere her tomb, regarding it as a keramat. Due to its eclectic architectural style, the mosque was nominated for the Singapore Institute of Architects 5th Colour Award and subsequently emerged as one of the winners of said award in 2000.

== See also ==
- Islam in Singapore
- List of mosques in Singapore
