= Artega =

Artega may refer to:

- Artega Automobile, German manufacturer of sports cars
- Artega tribe, African tribe
- Alfonso D'Artega (1907–1998), songwriter, conductor, arranger, and actor
- Jesús Loroño Artega (1926–1998), Spanish professional road racing cyclist

== See also ==
- Ortega (disambiguation)
