= Ortega (disambiguation) =

Ortega is a Spanish surname. Refer to this article for a list of prominent people named Ortega.

Ortega may also refer to:

== Places ==
- Ortega, Tolima, town in Colombia
- Ortega, California (disambiguation)
- Ortega, Jacksonville, historic neighborhood on the west bank of the St. Johns River in Jacksonville, Florida
- Ortega Highway, name of a portion of California State Route 74

== Others ==
- Ortega (grape), a white variety of grape
- Ortega (brand name), a brand name of Mexican food items sold in North America since the early 1980s
- Ortega y Gasset Awards, given to Spanish journalists
- Ortega (leafhopper), a genus of insects in the tribe Cicadellini

== See also ==
- Artega (disambiguation)
