= Arab Malaysians =

Ethnic group

Arab Malaysians Orang Arab Malaysia ماليزيون عرب اورڠ عرب مليسيا
Total population
- 500,000

Regions with significant populations
- Kuala Lumpur, Penang, Perlis, Kedah, Kelantan, Selangor, Pahang, Negeri Sembilan, Malacca, Johor, Sabah, Sarawak

Languages
- Malay, Arabic, English, other languages of Malaysia

Religion
- Sunni Islam

Related ethnic groups
- Hadhrami people, Arab Indonesians, Arab Singaporeans, Arab Filipinos, other people in the Arab diaspora, Malays, other ethnic groups in Malaysia and the Malay Archipelago

The Arab Malaysians (Malay: Orang Arab Malaysia; Arabic: ماليزيون عرب; Jawi: اورڠ عرب مليسيا) consists of people of full or partial Arab descent (specifically Hadhrami, other Southern Arabian and Gulf Arab descent) who were born in or immigrated to Malaysia.

Arab traders had been visiting Southeast Asia since pre-Islamic times, as Southeast Asia was well connected via the sea route to the markets of Arabia, Persia and China. These Arab traders came from all over the Arabian Peninsula, today comprising the nations of Saudi Arabia, Oman, Yemen, Qatar, Kuwait, Bahrain, UAE and other GCC nations. The earliest Arab traders who arrived in South East Asia were followers of Arabian traditional religion and other religions that had existed in Arabia before the advent of Islam, and a minority of Christians. Following the rise of Islam and the first caliphates, Islam was introduced by Arab traders in Malaysia in the 7th and 8th centuries. Arab interest in Southeast Asia soared during the Islamic era, during which more Arab traders arrived to spread Islam. Many Arab migrants were incorporated into the royalty and assimilated into the local Malay culture rather than retaining their Arab identity.

The federal territory of Kuala Lumpur and the states of Penang, Perlis, and Johor contain a high population of people with mixed Malay and Arab ancestry. Like the Arab diaspora residing in nearby countries such as Singapore, Indonesia, Brunei and the Philippines, The Arabs of Malaysia have been largely assimilated into the greater Malay culture and more-often do not consider themselves "Arab". This was a historical trend of Arab traders in Southeast Asia who quickly assimilated into the native culture.

== See also ==
- Arab diaspora
- Arab Indonesians
- Arab Singaporean
- Arab Filipinos
- Arabization in Malaysia
- Hadhrami people
- Islam in Malaysia
