= House of al-Sagoff =

Family of Arab Singaporeans of Hadhrami origin

The House of al-Sagoff (Arabic: آل السقاف; also transliterated as al-Saqqaf or as-Segaf) are a Hadhrami Arab family that has been historically active in Saudi Arabia, Yemen, Jordan, the United Arab Emirates, Malaysia, Indonesia and Singapore. Through intermarriage, the family formed social and economic connections with several other prominent families, particularly in Southeast Asia. They owned several properties, such as the Al-Saqqaf Palace in Mecca, Saudi Arabia (which was eventually bought by King Abdulaziz) and the Perseverance Estate in Singapore, where lemongrass was cultivated and community gatherings were held. The family traces its lineage to the Ba 'Alawi clan of the Banu Hashim in Hadhramaut.

Members of the Alsagoff family trace their lineage to Abd al-Rahman al Saqqaf, a prominent Sheikh from Tarim. He was a 13th-generation descendant of the progenitor of the Ba 'Alawi clan Ahmad Al-Muhajir, who was born in Basra in 273 AH.

== Notable members ==
=== Muhammad bin Aqeel Al-Saqqaf ===
He was a wealthy and powerful businessman and political leader who ruled over Dhofar, Oman for 25 years. According to the orientalist Johann Ludvik, he was given gifts by Muhammad Ali Pasha, who at that time ruled over Egypt, in an attempt to get him to join his administration.

=== Omar Al-Saqqaf ===
He served as the Saudi Minister of Foreign Affairs from 1968 to 1974. He was the incumbent Minister when King Faisal led an oil embargo on countries seen as being pro-Israel.

=== Ahmed Alawi Al-Saqqaf ===
He served as Jordanian Chief Justice under the governments of Tawfiq Abu al-Huda as well as Minister of Education and Minister of Justice.

=== Syed Saddiq bin Syed Abdul Rahman ===
He is a Malaysian politician who is currently serving as an MP for Muar, previously serving as the Minister of Youth and Sports under the second Mahathir cabinet. He is also the founder of the Malaysian United Democratic Alliance.

=== Datuk Syed Omar Alsagoff ===
He previously served as Malaysian Ambassador to Saudi Arabia.

=== Syed Abdur-Rahman ===
Syed Abdul Rahman Alsagoff came to Singapore with his son Ahmad. Their family would later start the Arabic School in Jalan Sultan, in 1912. A large section of Geylang, formally "Geylang Serai," formed part of the 'Perseverance Estate' which belonged to Syed Ahmad. The Alsagoffs had also served as municipal commissioners of Singapore, from 1872 to 1898, and 1928 to 1933.

=== Syed Ahmad ibn Abdur-Rahman ===
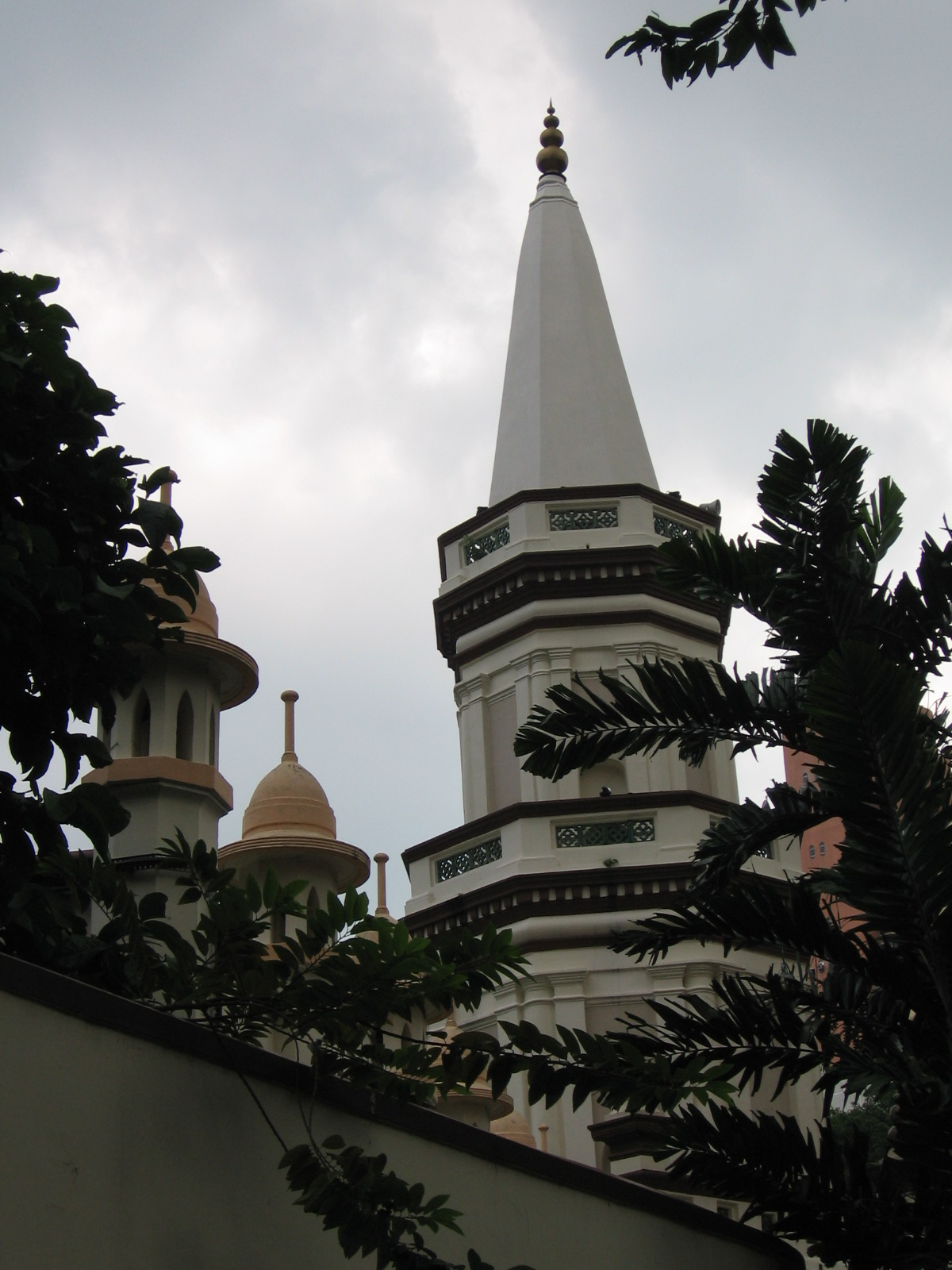
The Mosque of Sayyid Ahmad, his wife and parents-in-law, in Singapore, 2006

Sayyid Aḥmad ibn ʿAbdur-Raḥmān As-Saqqāf (Arabic: ٱلسَّيِّد أَحْمَد ٱبْن عَبْد الرَّحْمٰن ٱلسَّقَّاف), like his father, was a merchant. In 1848, he established the Alsagoff Company.

Ahmad married Raja Siti, daughter of Hajjah Fatimah, who was a local merchant and philanthropist, thus consolidating family ties in Singapore. Syed Mohamed bin Syed Ahmad was their son. The family, whose name became 'Alsagoff', were involved in philanthropic activities, such as financing the Masjid of Hajjah Fatimah on Beach Road in Kampong Glam. The graves of Sayyid Ahmad, and his wife and mother-in-law, are in the premises of this Masjid.

=== Syed Mohamed bin Ahmed ===
Syed Mohammad (Arabic: ٱلسَّيِّد مُحَمَّد بِن أَحْمَد ٱلسَّقَّاف Saiyid Muḥammad bin Aḥmad As-Saqqāf) was a senior member of the family active in business and civic roles. He received two land concessions from Sultan Abu Bakar of Johor; one in Kukup, where he could print his own currency, and the other in Kampong Nong Chik. He was also involved in Singapore's civil service undertaking several diplomatic posts. The first post he held was the Ottoman consul, where the Osmanieh Order inducted him into their ranks after he became consul. Syed Mohamed was also asked to conduct diplomacy on behalf of the Sultanate of Aceh during its conflict with the Dutch.

He owned a large estate where his nephew, Syed Omar Alsagoff, lived in a residence at what is now Kampong Bukit Tunggal, near Chancery Lane, where he held events. There was also a lake there that was used for recreational boating. After his death, his sons developed the Bukit Tunggal Estate in the 1920s. The Alsagoffs also held property in Beach Road and were, at one time the owners of the Raffles Hotel. The tomb (or Keramat) of Habib Nuh bin Muhammad Al-Habshi, built by Syed Mohamed around 1890, is maintained by members of the Alsagoff family.

=== Other members ===
- The Kingdom of Iraq's Honorary Consul was Syed Ibrahim bin Syed Omar Alsagoff. The government of Saudi Arabia later tapped him as their ambassador, becoming the Consul-General, and later the Honorary Consul for Turkey and Tunisia.
- Syed Mohamed bin Ahmad Alsagoff was commander of the Malaysian armed forces in Singapore from 1963 to 1965.
- ʿAli Redha, a politician.
- Khadijah ʿAbdullah, managing partner of an Egyptian magazine for women, and manager of the Raffles Hotel, in the 1960s.
- Faisal, co-founder of Horizon Education and Technologies Ltd.

== See also ==
- Banu Hashim
- Hadhramawt
- Islam in Singapore
- Quraysh
- Yemen
