= Yemen Times =

English-language newspaper in Yemen

The Yemen Times
- "To make Yemen a good world citizen"
- Logo used since 2023
- Type: bi-weekly
- Founder: Abdulaziz Al-Saqqaf
- Editor-in-chief: Nadia Al-Sakkaf
- Deputy editor: Ahlam Mohsen
- Managing editor: Brett Scott
- Staff writers: 13 (2015)
- Founded: 1990
- Ceased publication: 2015-04-09
- Relaunched: 2023 (as archive)
- Political alignment: Independent
- Language: English
- Headquarters: Sanaa, Yemen
- Country: Yemen
- Website: yementimes.com
- Free online archives: The Yemen Times archives

The Yemen Times (Arabic: يمن تايمز) was an independent English-language newspaper in Yemen. The paper was published twice weekly.

== History ==
=== 1990–1999 ===
The Yemen Times was founded in 1990 by Abdulaziz al-Saqqaf, an economics professor at Sanaa University, along with two assistants. The Times was among the dozens of newspapers founded in the wake of the reunification of Yemen and the new prospect of a democracy. Saqqaf registered the newspaper with the Ministry of Information and was granted Licence Number 9.

The first issue of the Yemen Times was published on 27 February 1991, focusing on Yemen and President Ali Abdullah Saleh’s stance of neutrality during the Gulf War, which had recently concluded. Reception to the first issue was generally positive, and within a few years the Times had become “Yemen’s most influential paper and the most successful commercially”, with numerous ministers, officials and politicians requesting interviews from it.

The Yemen Times routinely focused criticism on corrupt bureaucrats as opposed to President Saleh himself in order to not draw the ire of the government. However, this strategy was not always successful, as in one instance, armed tribesmen led by the governor of Shabwah’s son gathered outside the Times's office in protest after the paper had published an article exposing the governor for extorting money from local oil-related businesses. In another instance, the landowner of the Times’s office had invited its staff to lunch while Saqqaf was out of town before locking them out of the office, forcing them to find a new one.

The Times remained in printing throughout the Yemeni civil war in 1994, though the paper faced distribution issues and its staff was forced to live in its office. During the war the paper was primarily concerned with fact-checking government statements. In one instance, after the Northern government claimed to have shot down a Southern fighter aircraft, a photographer sent by the paper failed to find any wreckage in the area mentioned. Saqqaf was briefly detained by authorities early in the war after the Yemen Times published allegedly inflated casualty figures.

After the conclusion of the war, Saqqaf praised the reunification in the Times, and the paper organized a seminar on 14 July 1994 for "The Future of Yemen", in which it invited over 40 journalists from all three major political parties as well as smaller parties. Despite agreeing to do so, journalists from the ruling General People's Congress as well as the Islah Party failed to arrive, though the seminar proceeded with audience members including Gulf diplomats, foreign researchers, and Yemeni scholars. A Gulf diplomat attendee described hearing "nothing mildly treasonous" and "a lot of generalities." On 17 July, agents from the Political Security Organization (PSO) kidnapped over 15 participants in the seminar, including Saqqaf, beat them and held them in solitary confinement before releasing them the next day. The Yemen Times offices were also raided and its computers seized. A week after Saqqaf published an account for his detention on the front page of the Yemen Times, security officers raided, but did not close, the newspaper's offices.

Another English language Yemeni newspaper called the Yemen Observer was launched in 1996. Saqqaf saw the Observer, whose founder was presidential press secretary Faris Sanabani, as an attempt by the Yemeni government to co-opt the audience of the Yemen Times through a newspaper under government control. On 1 July 1996, the Times accused the PSO of having control over the central post office and throwing away copies of the Yemen Times addressed to international readers. On 7 July, during a speech marking the second anniversary of the end of the civil war, President Saleh accused the Yemen Times along with southern newspaper al-Ayyam of "dubious practices" and stating that "I am directing an early warning to them because I know that the minister of information is hesitant to take legal measures against the papers ... but I shall take the appropriate measures at the appropriate time." Saqqaf suspected that Saleh's comments may have been inspired by a recent copy of the Times in which it recalled how former president Ibrahim al-Hamdi had fought against corruption, in a subtle criticism of Saleh. The paper launched a website in 1997, becoming the first Yemeni newspaper to do so.

In November 1998, the Yemen Times published a front-page story with the large-written number "$22,500,000,000", referencing the total amount of money the Yemeni government had received over the previous 20 years. The article claimed that "a good part of the money" was pocketed by corrupt officials and authorities and allocated to civilians "who are part of the entourage of our political leadership." In the same month, the state filed a case against Saqqaf for “engaging in politically motivated misinformation” after the Ministry of Finance and the government’s auditors had failed to find any misallocated resources. The prosecution demanded an official retraction from the Yemen Times, a two-year suspension of its publishing licence and a six-month suspended jail sentence for Saqqaf. The case against Saqqaf wouldn't proceed further as he was killed in a traffic accident in Sanaa on 2 June 1999 while attempting to cross a street.

=== 2000–2004 ===
After the death of Abdulaziz, the new editor-in-chief of the Yemen Times was declared to be his son Walid al-Saqqaf, a computer engineering student who had previously designed the website for the newspaper. Walid opted for a less confrontational style than his predecessor, stating that “I wasn’t as charismatic or driven as my father, so I took a more subtle approach, focusing on the professional aspect of journalism rather than the advocacy aspect”. Taking out a loan and investing $300,000, the Saqqaf family managed to purchase a Heidelberg printing press and other equipment in order for the Yemen Times to print in-house. The paper also launched a local Arabic radio station which discussed more everyday issues compared to the Times such as electricity, water, safety, and women’s rights.

The Yemen Times provided extensive coverage of the USS Cole bombing in October 2000, the aftermath of the attack and the subsequent investigation and trials. The international attention given to Yemen in the aftermath of the attack also lead to the increased notability of the Yemen Times, which began receiving many international correspondents.

=== 2005–2015 ===
In 2005, Walid's sister Nadia al-Sakkaf became editor-in-chief of the Times, in turn becoming the first female editor of a newspaper in Yemen and only the third female worker in the Times by then. Nadia lead a significant restructuring of the Yemen Times, dismissing approximately half of its staff, which she labeled unproductive, within one year. She demanded change internally, firing older journalists who would refuse to write their stories in English, instead having their hand-written Arabic copies translated, and hiring more female writers whom she would mentor in journalism.

=== Present ===
Since 2014, the newspaper was unable to continue issuing the printed version of the newspaper due to the Yemeni Civil War and was deemed defunct. The website said that it "hopes to resume when conditions permit.” As of 2024, the newspaper’s website acts as an archive of its own publications.

== Awards ==
In 1995, the Yemen Times won the National Press Club's International Award for Freedom of the Press. Abdulaziz al-Saqqaf travelled to Washington D.C. to accept the award. In 2004, managing editor Iona Craig won the Martha Gellhorn Prize for her work with the paper. In 2006, the International Press Institute awarded the Yemen Times its Free Media Pioneer Award. Board of directors member Raidan Al-Saqqaf accepted the award from Scottish First Minister Jack McConnell during a ceremony on 30 May, in what was described by the Times as "the most prestigious award ever given to a Yemeni newspaper." In December 2006, Nadia al-Sakkaf received the Gebran Tueni Award from the World Association of Newspapers at a ceremony in Lebanon.

== See also ==
- List of newspapers in Yemen
- Media of Yemen
