= Nadia Al-Sakkaf =

Yemeni politician; editor-in-chief of the Yemen Times

- نادية عبد العزيز السقاف
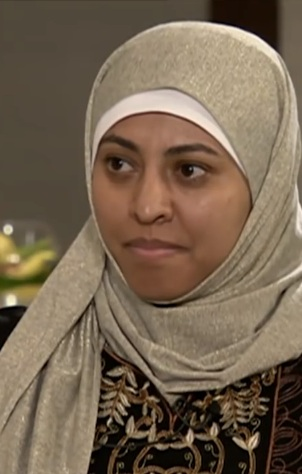
- Al-Sakkaf interviewed by AlJazeera in 2015

Yemeni Minister of Information
- In office 7 November 2014 – 1 December 2015
- President: Abdrabbuh Mansur Hadi
- Prime Minister: Khaled Bahah

Yemen Times editor-in-chief
- In office 2005–2014

Personal details
- Born: 8 March 1977 (age 49)
- Parent: Abdulaziz Al-Saqqaf (father)
- Education: Birla Institute of Technology; University of Stirling; University of Reading
- Awards: Business for Peace; 2013

Nadia Abdulaziz Al-Sakkaf (Arabic: نادية عبد العزيز السقاف; born 8 March 1977) is a former Yemeni Minister and politician. She was the editor in chief of the Yemen Times from 2005 until 2014, before becoming Yemen's first female Minister of Information. She fled Yemen in 2015 after the coup and is currently an independent researcher in politics, media, development and gender studies based in the United Kingdom. In 2011, Al-Sakkaf gave a popular TED talk called "See Yemen through my eyes" which had over 3 million views.

== Early life and education ==
Al-Sakkaf was born in March 1977 to Aziza and Abdulaziz Al-Saqqaf. Her father was a lecturer in economics at Sana'a University, a founder of the Arab Organization for Human Rights and founded the Yemen Times in 1990. She has two brothers and one sister.

Al-Sakkaf has a Bachelor of Engineering in computer science from the Birla Institute of Technology in India, a Master of Science in Information Systems Management from the University of Stirling in the United Kingdom and a PhD in political science from Reading University. She was a student member of Amnesty International.

== Career ==
Al-Sakkaf worked as a systems analyst at the Arab Experts Center for Consultancy and Systems. She joined the Yemen Times in July 2000 as a translator and reporter. The newspaper is the country's first independent English language newspaper and was started by her father in 1991. He died in 1999 after being hit by a car, although Al-Sakkaf and her brother believe he was assassinated for opposing the regime of President Ali Abdullah Saleh. She became an assistant editor in September 2000.

Al-Sakkaf worked in Oxfam's humanitarian program in 2003. In March 2005, she became the editor in chief of the Yemen Times. In 2011, during the Arab Spring in Yemen, Al-Sakkaf and her staff participated in protests demanding that Saleh step down and played a significant role in reporting the Yemeni Revolution to the wider world. Al-Sakkaf is a member of the Yemeni Journalists Syndicate and the International Journalists Syndicate. She is an advocate for women's rights, successfully recruiting female journalists to bring a gender balance to the newspaper's staff and running articles on female genital mutilation.

In 2012, she launched Radio Yemen Times, an FM radio station which was Yemen's first free public platform for expression, broadcasting ten hours a day as an alternative to the state-monopolised media. In 2014 she launched Radio Lana, the first community radio in the south of Yemen.

Al-Sakkaf was appointed Information Minister under Prime Minister Khalid Bahah in 2014. On 20 January 2015, when Houthi fighters stormed the capital and took control of all media outlets, Al-Sakkaf took to Twitter to report the coup. She later said, "I felt more like a reporter than the minister of information. I wasn't scared at the time but I was afterwards when I realised the implications. My name was everywhere. I had more than 20,000 more followers on Twitter in one day." In May 2015, Al-Sakkaf was living in exile in Riyadh as a member of the internationally recognised Yemeni government seeking to restore President Abdrabbuh Mansur Hadi to power.

Al-Sakkaf is the director of Yemen 21 Forum a development NGO based in Sana'a.

In 2020 she is co-founder of the National Reconciliation Movement, a Yemeni initiative for peace, and in 2021 she co-founded Connecting Yemen, an organisation advocating for affordable and equal access of internet in Yemen. She serves as deputy chair of the National Committee responsible for Monitoring the Implementation of the National Dialogue Conference's outcomes.

Al-Sakkaf has published in the fields of politics, media, and development. She also published a book collection on the experiences of Yemeni women as electoral candidates available in Arabic and English. Her TED Talk Yemen through my eyes, is one of the most known videos on Yemen as it was translated to 34 languages and had over half a million views.

== Awards and honors ==
Al-Sakkaf was the first recipient of the Gebran Tueni Award in 2006, given by the World Association of Newspapers and News Publishers and An-Nahar Newspaper in Beirut. She received the Free Media Pioneers Award from the International Press Institute in Vienna on behalf of the Yemen Times in the same year. In 2013, she received the Oslo Business for Peace Award, an award chosen by winners of the Nobel Prizes in Economics and Peace and given to leaders in the private sector who have "demonstrated transformative and positive change through ethical business practices." She was recognised by the BBC as one of "100 women who changed the world" in 2013. She was also chosen by the World Economic Forum as one of 2015 distinguished Young Global Leaders.

== Publications ==
- Al-Sakkaf, Nadia (October 2012). "Yemen's Women and the Quest for Change: Political Participation after the Arab Revolution" (PDF). Friedrich Ebert Stiftung.

== Personal life ==
Al-Sakkaf is married to a Jordanian man and they have two children.
