= Samar Alsaggaf =

Saudi anatomist

Saudi Arabian Cultural Mission to the United States
- Medical and Health Science Programs Director; 2010–2015

Personal details
- Born: July 27, 1964 (age 61); Saudi Arabia
- Occupation: Professor of Human Anatomy and Embryology
- Website: King Abdulaziz University profile

Samar Mohammad Alsaggaf is a Saudi Professor in human anatomy and embryology and the first female anatomist in Saudi Arabia. She is currently a professor in human anatomy at King Abdulaziz University. Previously, she was the director of Medical and Health Science Programs at the Saudi Arabian Cultural Mission to the United States in Washington, D.C. from 2010 to 2015.

== Early life and education ==
Alsaggaf was born in Saudi Arabia on 27 July 1964. In 1988, she completed her bachelors of medicine and surgery (MBBS) in King Abdulaziz University. She went to obtain a master's degree in anatomy and embryology from King Saud University in 1993 and later a PhD in the same field in 1996. Her thesis was titled "Effect of Irradiation on the development of the cerebellar cortex of Guinea pig". In 2009, she obtained a Certificate of Medical Education from the University of Illinois.

In 2013, she received an honorary doctorate from University of Saint Joseph in Connecticut.

== Career ==
Alsaggaf was the director of Medical and Health Science Programs at the Saudi Arabian Cultural Mission to the United States in Washington, D.C. from 2010 to 2015.
