= Abdul-Wasa Al-Saqqaf =

Yemeni writer (born 1974)

- عبدالواسع السقاف
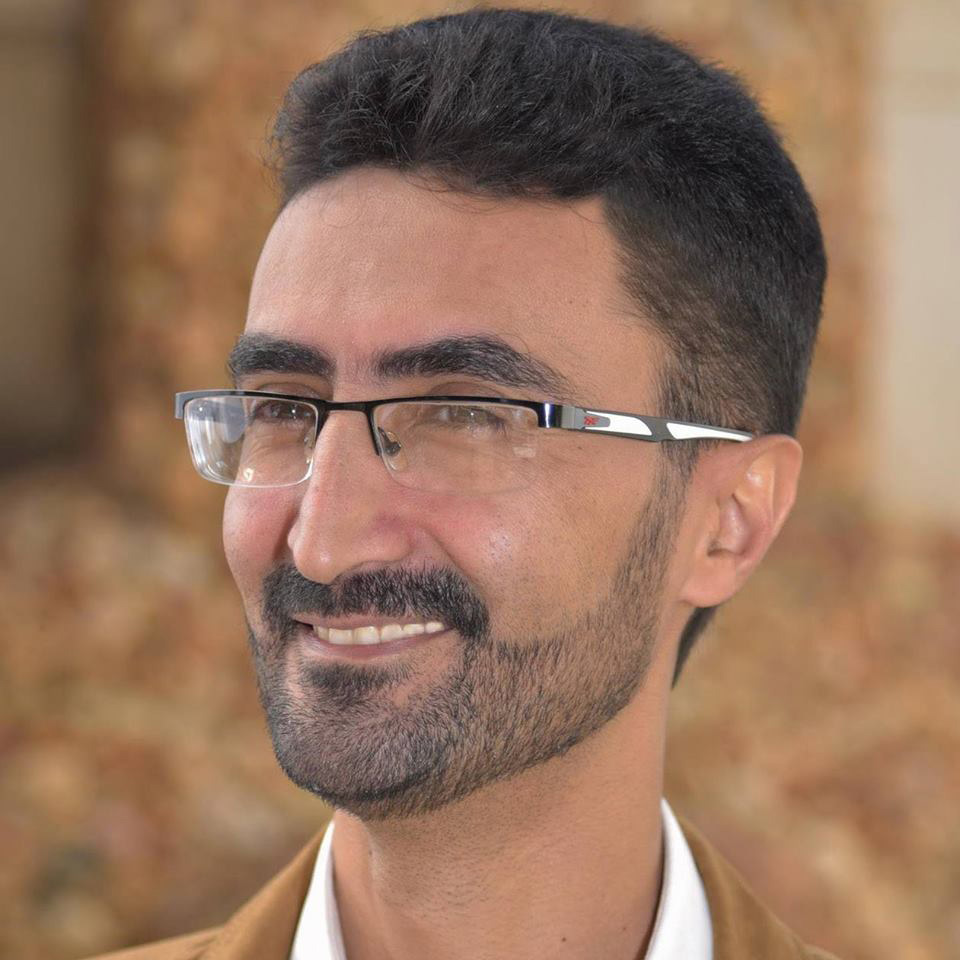
- 2019
- Born: 12 February 1974 (age 52); Taiz, Taiz Governorate, Yemen Arab Republic
- Citizenship: Yemeni
- Occupations: Journalist, poet, writer, translator
- Political party: Independent
- Movement: Jasmine Revolution
- Children: Three
- Awards: Honorable Membership of World Press Council (2012)

Abdul-Wasa Taha Al-Saqqaf (born 12 February 1974) is a Yemeni writer, poet, researcher, analyst and translator.

== Writings ==
Al-Saqqaf's writings are classical and focus on social issues. They also have some features of modern poetry, touching on issues such as the breakdown of social norms and cultural sureties, valorization of the despairing individual in the face of an unmanageable future, rejection of history and the substitution of a mythical past, and stream of consciousness. His poetry also displays a vivid sense of humor.

Al-Saqqaf also translates poetry and has conducted research on social, political and economic issues. Two of his poetry collections have been published: Alaa What Next and The Mirage Man.
