= Awaz Sayeed =

Indian writer

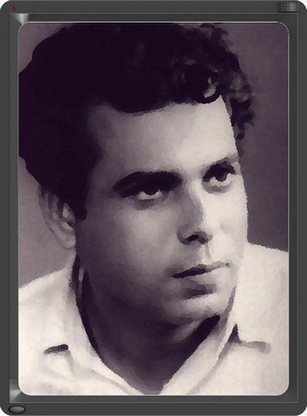
- Awaz Sayeed

Personal details
- Born: 3 March 1934 Hyderabad, Telangana, India
- Died: 2 July 1995 (aged 61) Chicago, United States
- Spouse: Kaneez Fatima
- Children: Dr Ausaf Sayeed, Dr Seema Nishat
- Parents: Sayeed bin Awaz Bin Jabir Bin Abdullah (father); Noorunnissa Begum Al Khulaqi (mother)
- Occupation: Writer and Poet (Urdu)

Awaz Bin Sayeed, also spelt Evaz Saeed (3 March 1934 – 2 July 1995) (Urdu: عوض سعید) (pen name: Chaand, چاند), was a modern short-story writer, poet, playwright, Khaka-naveez and humorist from Hyderabad, India.

== Early life and family ==
Awaz Sayeed was born on 3 March 1934 in Hyderabad, to Sayeed Bin Awaz Bin Jabir Bin Abdullah (father) and Noorunnissa Begum Al Khulaqi (mother).

Awaz Sayeed was a Hadhrami Arab by descent belonging to a family of Hyderabad Deccan, with roots in Mukallah in Hadhramaut (present-day Yemen). He belongs to the Al-Musalli (Al-Yafai) tribe. His father served as State Financier under His Highness Sultan Omar bin Awadh Al Qu'aiti (Nawab Sir Jan-Baz Jung Bahadur K.C.I.E.) and His Highness Sultan Sir Saleh bin Ghalib Al Qu'aiti (Saif Nawaz Jung Bahadur).

Sayeed completed his early education at Anwar-ul-Uloom High School. Thereafter, he passed out Matriculation from the City College in April 1948, Intermediate from Chaderghat College in April 1952 and enrolled in Anwar-ul-Uloom College to pursue a Bachelor of Arts (B.A.) but only completed the first year owing to his getting employment in the Food Corporation of India in 1954. Awaz Sayeed married Kaneez Fatima in 1960. He has two children -- a son Dr Ausaf Sayeed and a daughter, Dr Seema Nishat.

== Literary career ==
Sayeed's first Urdu Afsana Jeetey Jaagtey was published in 1949 in Nizam-e-Lahore. Thereafter, several of his stories have been published in Urdu magazines of the Indian Sub-continent.

He also wrote humorous works, including Shaqsi-Khaka-Nigari (life sketches), in which he portrayed known personalities of Urdu literature.

Awaz Sayeed's stories have been translated into English, Hindi and Telugu.

Some English translations of his Urdu short stories have been included in at least two recent English compilations of translated works by Urdu writers of the Indian Sub-Continent. The first book Despairing voices: A Collection of Modern Urdu Short Stories edited and translated by Syed Sarwar (Satyam Publishing House, 2011) includes his four Urdu short stories Raat Wala Ajnabi ('The Night's Stranger'), Udaas Nasal Ka Aakhri Aadmi ('Last Man of the Melancholic Race'), Andha Kunwan ('Dry Well') and Coma. The second book, New Urdu Writings: From India and Pakistan by Rakhshanda Jalil (Westland Ltd, 2013) includes the story Chubhan ('Pin-Prick').

The 1998 M.Phil. thesis of Nusrat Jahan is titled 'Awaz Sayeed Ki Shaqsiyat Aur Fan' (عوض سید – شخصیت اور فن) and the 2006 M.Phil. thesis by Aliya Maqsood is titled 'Awaz Sayeed Ba Haisiyat Khaka Nigar' (عوض سید – بحیثیت خا کہ نگار).

== Books ==
Awaz Sayeed published seven books: six of them are collections of short stories: Sai Ka Safar (1969), Teesra Mujasamma (1973), Raat Wala Ajnabi (1977), Kohe-Nida (1977), Benaam Mausamon Ka Nauha (1987) and Kuwaan Aadmi Aur Samandar (1993) and a book on khake (pen portraits) called Khake (1985).

The second reprint of the book Khake was produced in 2006 by his son Ausaf Sayeed in association with the Urdu Academy Jeddah. The book was released by Arjun Singh, the then Minister of Human Resource Development, Government of India, during a special function in Jeddah. In August 2009, Sayeed's published and unpublished works were published in two volumes titled Kuliyaat-e-Awaz Sayeed by his son Ausaf Sayeed, which was released by Mohammad Hamid Ansari, the then vice-president of India. The book has been published by Educational Publishing House, New Delhi. The entire collection of Awaz Sayeed's Urdu short stories is available on Rektha's website.

== Death ==
Sayeed died on 2 July 1995 while on a visit to Chicago, Illinois, USA. He is buried at the Rosehill Cemetery, Peterson in Chicago.
