= Ortega, California =

Ortega, California may refer to:

- Ortega, San Joaquin County, California, San Joaquin County, California
- Ortega, Santa Barbara County, California, Santa Barbara County, California
