= Ausaf Sayeed =

Indian diplomat (born 1963)

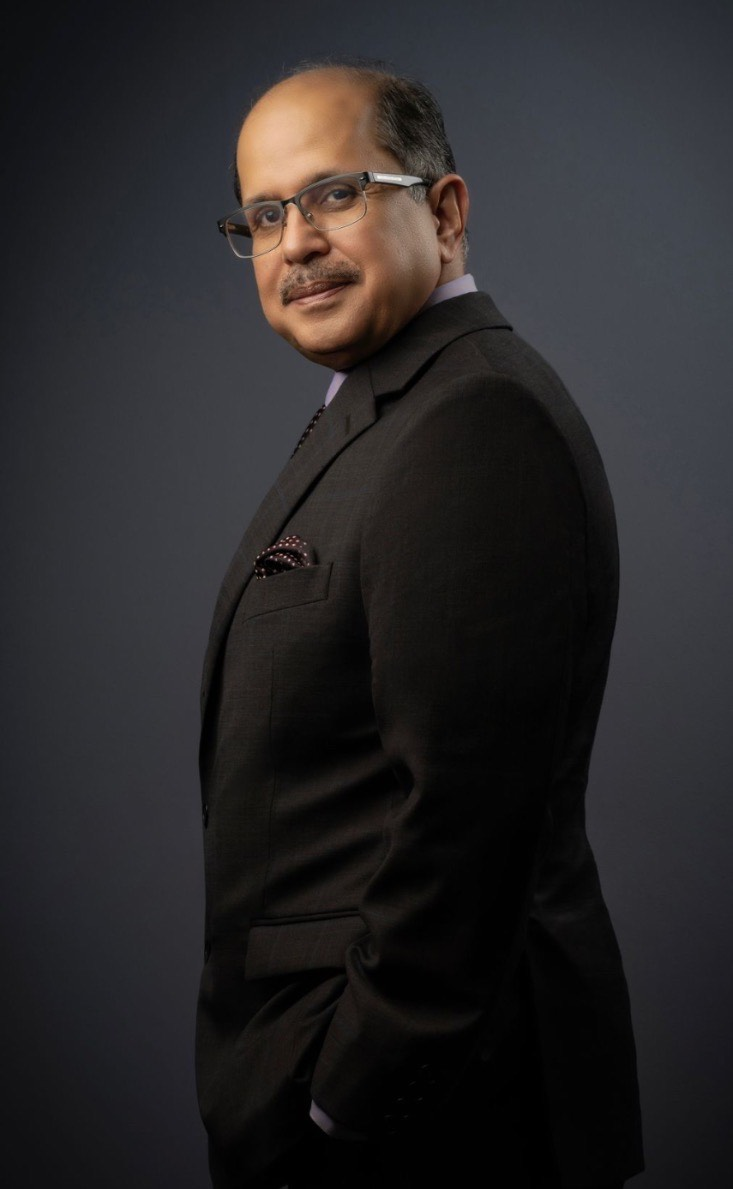

Ambassador of India to the Kingdom of Saudi Arabia
- In office 29 April 2019 – 14 March 2022
- Preceded by: Ahmed Jawed
- Succeeded by: Suhel Ajaz Khan

High Commissioner of India to Seychelles
- In office 17 February 2017 – 8 April 2019
- Preceded by: Sanjay Panda
- Succeeded by: Dalbir Singh Suhag

Ambassador of India to Yemen
- In office 19 September 2010 – 15 July 2013
- Succeeded by: Amrit Lugun

Personal details
- Born: 18 September 1963 (age 63) Hyderabad, India
- Spouse: Farha Sayeed
- Children: Faateh, Faaleh & Azhaan
- Parents: Awaz Sayeed (father); Kaneez Fatima (mother)
- Education: (MS) (PhD) Osmania University (Diploma) American University in Cairo
- Occupation: Retired Diplomat

Ausaf Sayeed (born 18 September 1963) is a retired Indian diplomat of the Indian Foreign Service who served as an Ambassador of India to Seychelles, Saudi Arabia and Yemen.

== Education ==
Sayeed has earned a Master of Science and PhD degrees in Geology from Osmania University in Hyderabad and an Advanced Diploma from American University in Cairo.

== Career ==
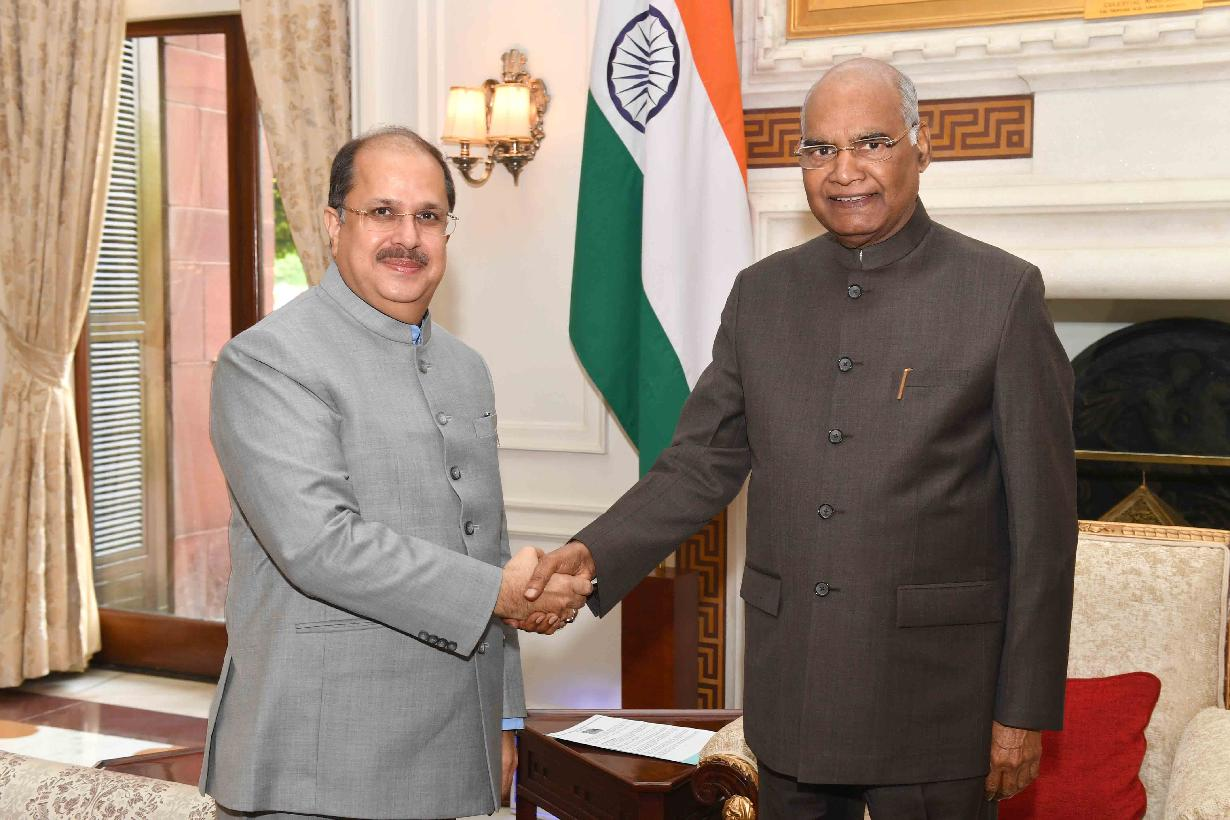
Ausaf Sayeed meeting with the President of India, Ram Nath Kovind, at Rashtrapati Bhavan on 25 April 2019

Sayeed is a career diplomat from 1989 batch of the Indian Foreign Service. He has 34 years of diplomatic experience, having served in countries like Egypt, Saudi Arabia (three tenures), Qatar, Denmark, Yemen, Chicago and Seychelles.

He served as Secretary (CPV & OIA) in the Ministry of External Affairs from 15 March 2022 to 30 September 2023. He previously served as the Ambassador of India to Saudi Arabia from April 2019 to March 2022. Ausaf Sayeed formally presented his credentials to King Salman on 16 June 2019.

Before this assignment he served as High Commissioner of India to Seychelles from 17 February 2017 till April 2019. Earlier in August 2013 he became the first Muslim and first Hyderabadi to be appointed as the Consul General of India in Chicago. Earlier he served as Ambassador of India to Yemen from September 2010 to July 2013, being the first person of Hadhrami origin to be appointed as India's Ambassador to Yemen.

Sayeed has worked on political, economic, consular, and cultural issues, besides Hajj management.

He launched several business groupings during his assignment in the Persian Gulf countries to promote trade and economic relations between India and the Gulf Cooperation Council.

Sayeed has contributed to promoting India’s cultural heritage abroad. He was associated with the inauguration of the Maulana Azad Cultural Center in Cairo (1992). In 1997, he organized the "Satyajit Ray: in retrospect", a one-week film festival of Satyajit Ray’s films in Riyadh, Saudi Arabia. As Coordinator of the Indian Cultural Center in Qatar, he was instrumental in organizing several cultural and literary events. In 1999, he organized a 9-day festival India Week in Qatar in association with the National Council of Culture, Art and Heritage in Qatar in which several artists from India participated. During his tenure in Copenhagen, Denmark from 2000-2004, he extended support to a project called `Crosscurrents: The Indo-Danish Painters' meet in which joint painting exhibitions and workshops by Indian and Danish painters were organized in various cities in India and Denmark.

During his tenure as the Consul General of India in Jeddah, he organised the first-ever India Festival in Jeddah (September 2005), followed by the First Asian Festival in Jeddah (October 2006) and the First Asian Film Festival in Saudi Arabia (February 2008). He was closely involved with the formation of the Saudi-India Friendship Society in 2006 under the patronage of the Saudi Ministry of Information and Culture. He was also associated with the Saudi-India Civil Society Dialogue. He was instrumental in organising the visit of the First All-Women Saudi Student Delegation (from Dar-Al Hekma College) to India in 2007.

He formed the Asian Consuls General Club (ACGC) in Jeddah in 2005, which was composed of Consuls General from thirteen Asian countries. He was instrumental in the publication of the book Historic Indo-Arab Ties (September 2005) by the Indian Consulate. He was the main architect behind the introduction of external Urdu examinations of MANUU in the Kingdom of Saudi Arabia for the benefit of Non-resident Indians (NRIs). He has advocated extensive use of digital technology to learn, and spread the Urdu language, especially among the youth and children.

Ausaf Sayeed launched a revamped Saudi–India Business Network (SIBN) in Saudi Arabia in September 2020, initially with chapters in the cities of Jeddah and Riyadh. Later a chapter was launched in Dammam. He also re-launched the Indo-Saudi Medical Forum (ISMF) with chapters in Jeddah and Riyadh to boost cooperation in the healthcare sector between India and Saudi Arabia. Originally, the ISMF was launched in the year 2008 during his tenure in Jeddah as the Consul General of India.

He was one of the key negotiators to set up the Strategic Partnership Council between India and Saudi Arabia during Prime Minister Shri Narendra Modi's visit to Riyadh in October 2019. He was also instrumental in the signing of a memorandum of understanding (MoU) on Yoga between India and Saudi Arabia, the first such agreement signed by any Islamic nation with India. The prestigious Yoga Mithra Award was presented to Ausaf Sayeed by the S-Vyasa University for his efforts to promote Yoga in Saudi Arabia.

As Secretary (CPV & OIA) he has overseen India's overall relations with countries of the GCC and WANA regions and helped in further cementing India's ties with the Arab and Islamic countries. During his tenure, Egyptian President Abdel Fattah El-Sisi visited India as Chief Guest of the Republic Day in January 2023 while Prime Minister Shri Narendra Modi visited Egypt in June 2023. The Crown Prince and Prime Minister of Saudi Arabia HRH Mohammed Bin Salman Al Saud paid a bilateral visit to India on 11 September 2023, after participating in the G20 Leaders' Summit.

== Publications ==
Ausaf Sayeed has published three books:

1. Indian Art & Culture (2025)
2. Trends In Indian Culture And Heritage: For Civil Services (Prelims and Mains) and other Competitive Examinations (2012)
3. Trends in Objective Geology For Civil Services & Other Competitive Examinations (1990)

He has also compiled and edited the Urdu book Kulliyat-e-Awaz Sayeed, which consists of the entire Urdu literary works of his father, late Awaz Sayeed. The book Kulliyat-e-Awaz Sayeed was released by the then Vice President of India Mohammad Hamid Ansari on 13 August 2009.

He is working on several other books, including Haj: an Indian Experience through the Ages and Indian Rubats, Madarsas and Wakfs in the Holy Cities of Makkah and Madinah.

He has to his credit a research paper on Petrology and Petrogenesis of Syenites from the Cuddapah Basin, Andhra Pradesh, Journal, Geological Society of India, Volume 43, March 1994, pp 225–237.

He is an avid columnist who writes on foreign policy issues, with a focus on the Middle East, and runs a blog called West Asia Review.
