= Ahmed Abdullah Masdoosi =

Pakistani lawyer and activist (1905 - 1968)

Ahmed Abdullah Al Masdoosi
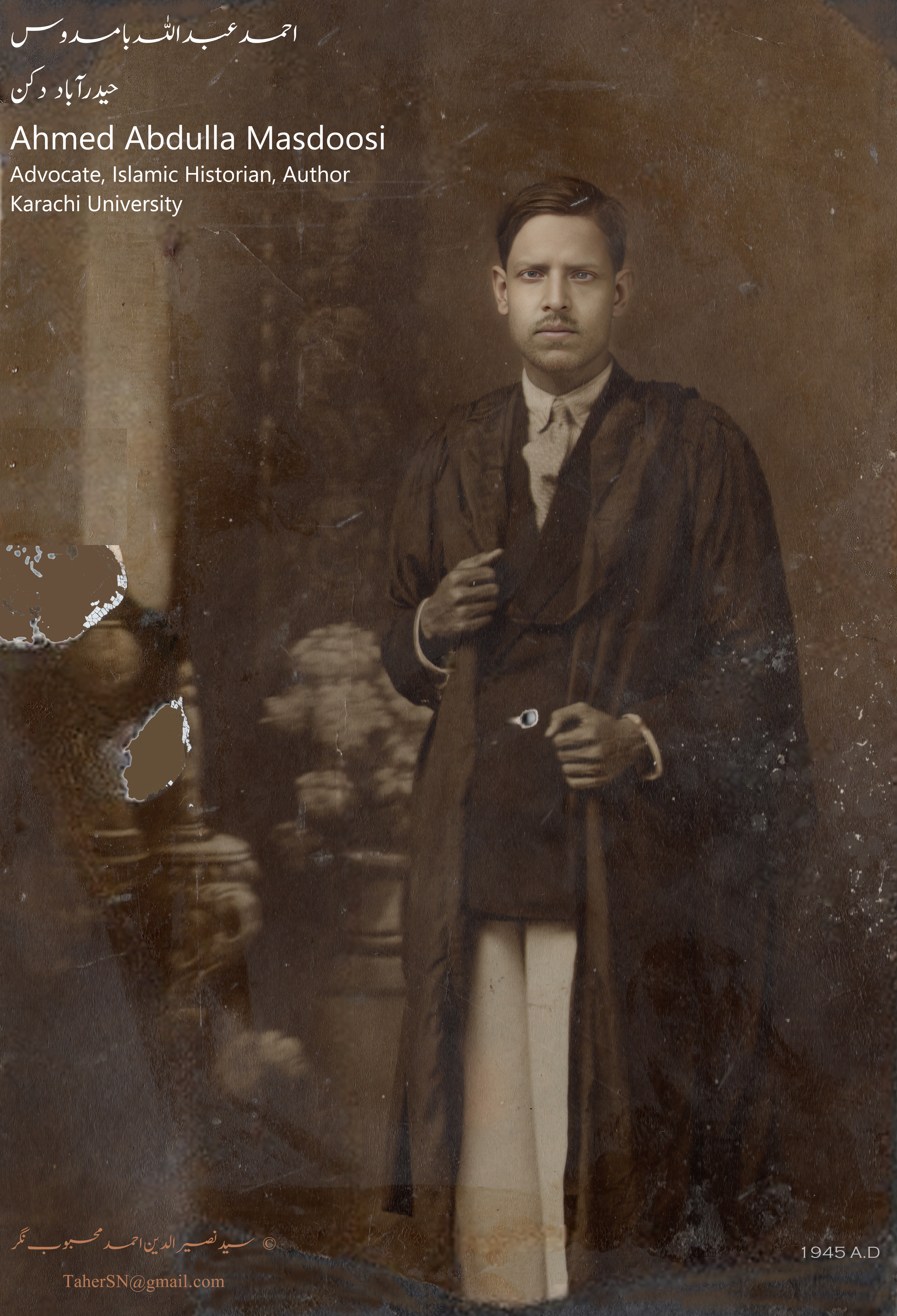
- Born: Ahmad Abdullāh al- Masdūsī; 1905; Mahboobnagar, Hyderabad Deccan, India
- Died: 1968 (aged 62–63); Karachi, Pakistan
- Occupations: Islamic Research, Chart Maker, Map Making, Law
- Writing career
- Pen name: Masdoosi, M A Al
- Period: 1940–1967
- Subjects: Comparative Religion, Law, Humanity
- Movements: Bahadur Yar Jung Academy, Anjuman Khuddam Millat

Ahmad Abdullāh al- Masdūsī (Arabic: احمد عبدالله المسدوسى) (born 1905, died 1968) was a Pakistani activist and lawyer. He was active in social welfare, and community improvement activities.

He joined the Malis-e-Ittehad-ul-Muslimeen in 1938 and with the beginning of a political career gave up his legal practice and moved to Hyderabad. His villa was near the Mouzam Jahi Market. He was involved in the legal proceedings around the annexation of Hyderabad by India. He migrated to Karachi, in Pakistan, after the annexation. He authored several books including Living Religions of the World, a Socio-Political Study (1962) and served as Professor of Law at Karachi University.
