= Fatimah binte Sulaiman =

Singaporean businesswoman and philanthropist

Hajjah Fatimah binti Sulaiman
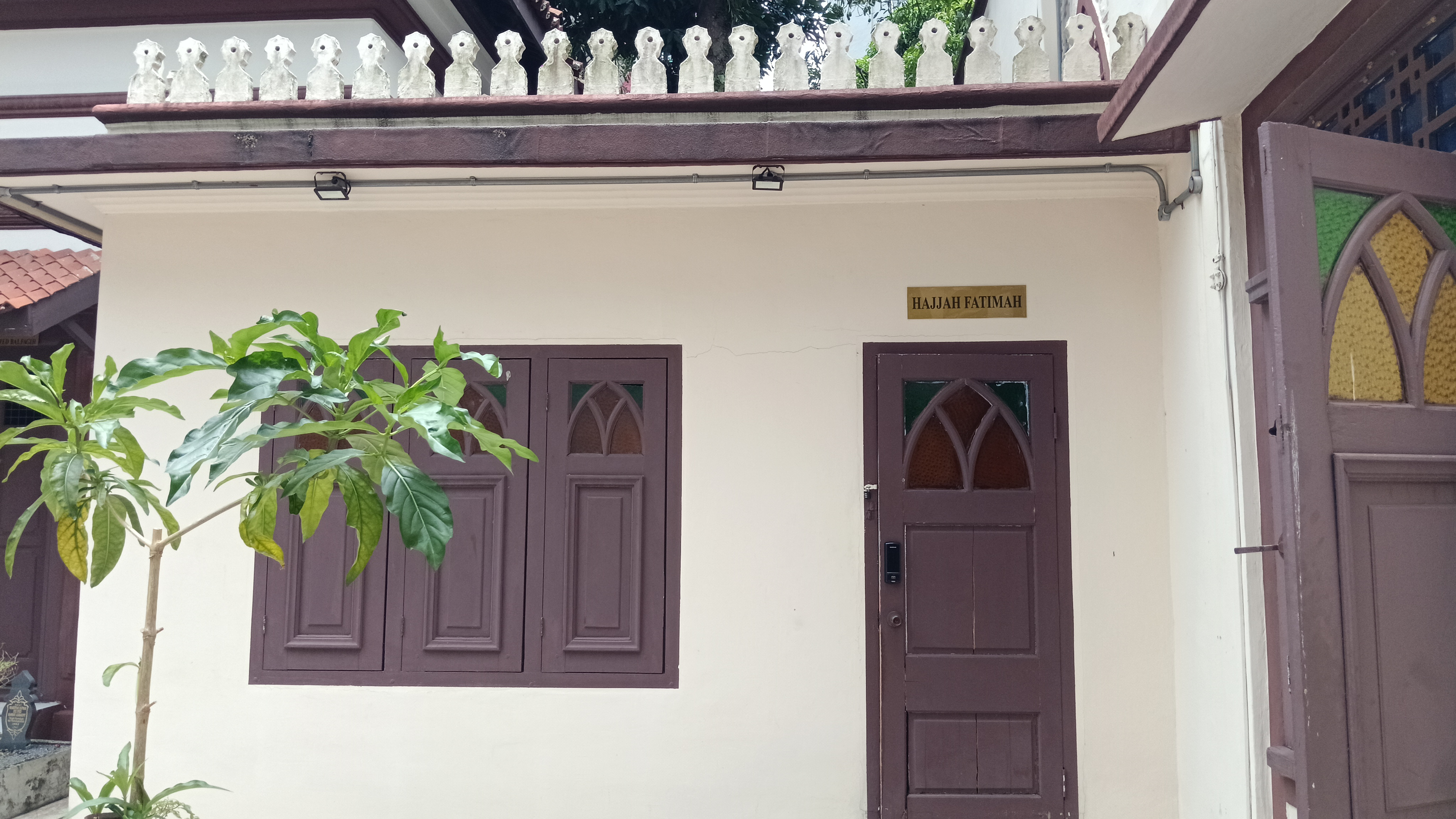
- The mausoleum of Fatimah behind the mihrab of the Hajjah Fatimah Mosque.
- Title: Sultana of Gowa

Personal life
- Born: Dutch Malacca
- Died: 1852 Singapore
- Resting place: Masjid Hajjah Fatimah, Kampong Glam; 1°18′10.4″N 103°51′46.1″E
- Children: Raja Siti

Religious life
- Religion: Sunni Islam

Fatimah binti Sulaiman (d. 1852), also known by her nickname the Sultana of Gowa, was a merchant and philanthropist from Malacca who settled in Singapore. She was the founder of Masjid Hajjah Fatimah, a mosque situated along Beach Road. In recognition of her philanthropy, wealth and her founding of the mosque, Fatimah was inducted into the Singapore Women’s Hall of Fame in 2014.

== Biography ==
The early life of Fatimah is relatively unknown, with the exception of the fact that she lived much of her early life in Malacca. At a young age, Fatimah was betrothed to a Bugis merchant of royal descent, whom she accompanied to Singapore as his business was based in the country. When he died, Fatimah took over her husband's business and inherited most of his wealth. In the 1840s, robbers attacked her house twice, while the second occasion involved her house being set on fire. Grateful for her safety during these happenings, Fatimah decided to demolish what remained of her old house and build a mosque there instead. She hired European architects to help design the proposed mosque which was completed between 1845 to 1846. She also built houses for the poor as part of her philanthropy.

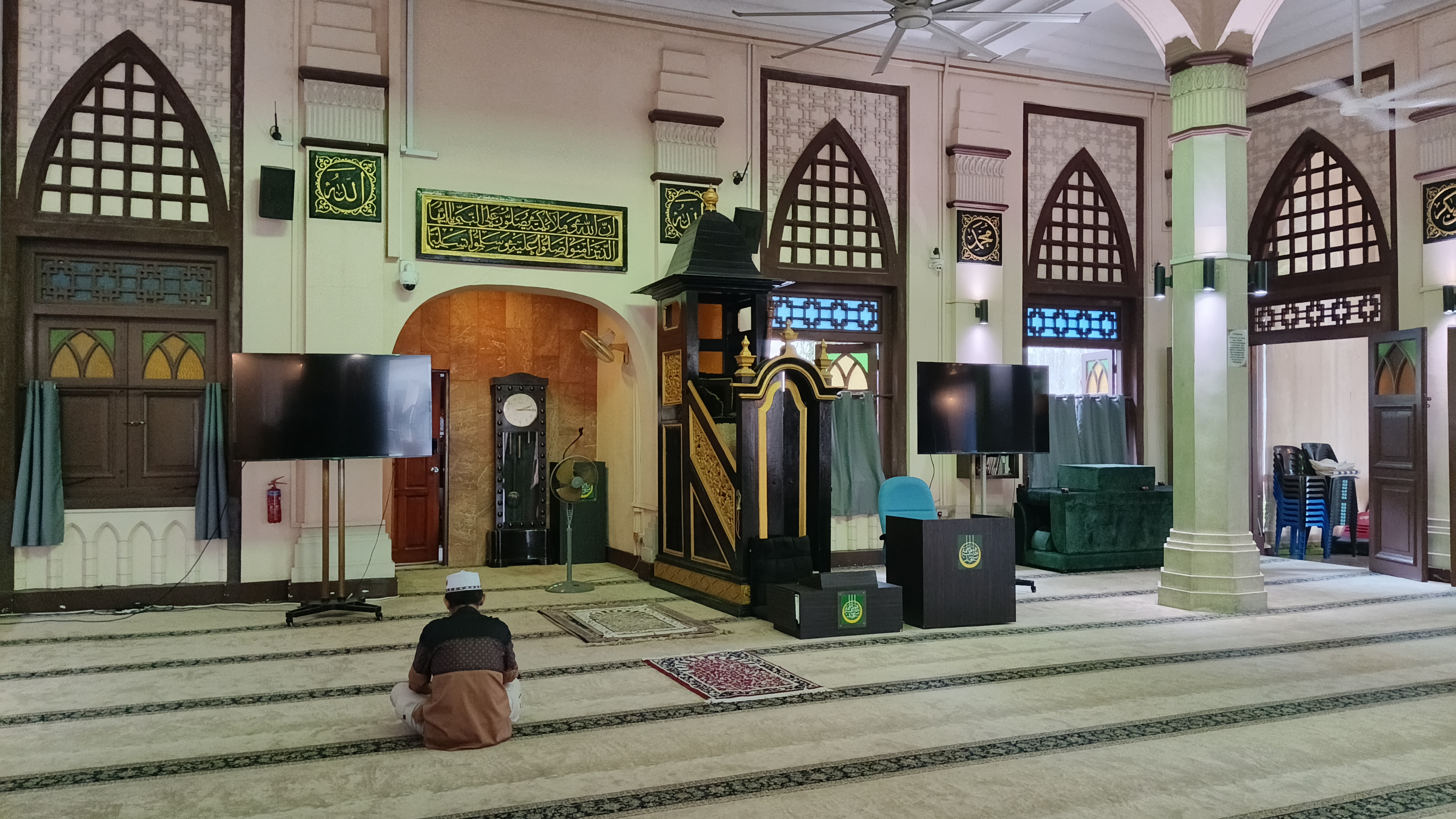
Masjid Hajjah Fatimah was built in 1845 and is a national monument of Singapore.

At some point of time, Fatimah went for the Ḥajj pilgrimage, earning her the title Hajjah, a term for females who go on said pilgrimage.

Fatimah died of old age and was buried in the mosque she founded, Masjid Hajjah Fatimah. Her date of death is unknown, but according to her descendants, she died in 1852. She was succeeded by her daughter, Raja Siti, who married a man from the Alsagoff clan. Ownership of her business, as well as the management of the mosque, was handed over to the Alsagoff family. The Alsagoffs held control over the mosque until after the independence of Singapore, when the Majlis Ugama Islam Singapura (MUIS) took over of the ownership of the mosque, although the Alsagoffs still do manage the mosque under the MUIS but to a limited extent.

== Legacy ==
After her death, the mausoleum of Fatimah inside Masjid Hajjah Fatimah became temporarily revered as keramat, although this practice did not survive until the modern day. However, a tradition that has survived to the present day is the annual feast at the mosque to commemorate her death anniversary. Masjid Hajjah Fatimah was also gazetted as a national monument of Singapore in 1973.

Lauded for her contributions to female empowerment in Singapore, Fatimah was inducted into a nine-member Woman's Wall of Fame by the Singapore Council of Women's Organisations. In recognition of her philanthropy, wealth, as well as the fact that she was the founder of one of the country's national monuments, Fatimah was inducted into the Singapore Women’s Hall of Fame in 2014.

In the registry of the MUIS, Fatimah is one of three women who founded mosques in Singapore, the other two being Khadijah binti Mohammed who founded Masjid Khadijah along Geylang Road and Mak Minah Palembang who founded Masjid Darul Aman at Eunos.

== See also ==
- Alsagoff family
- Syed Omar Aljunied
