= Abdulaziz Al-Saqqaf =

Yemeni activist (1951–1999)

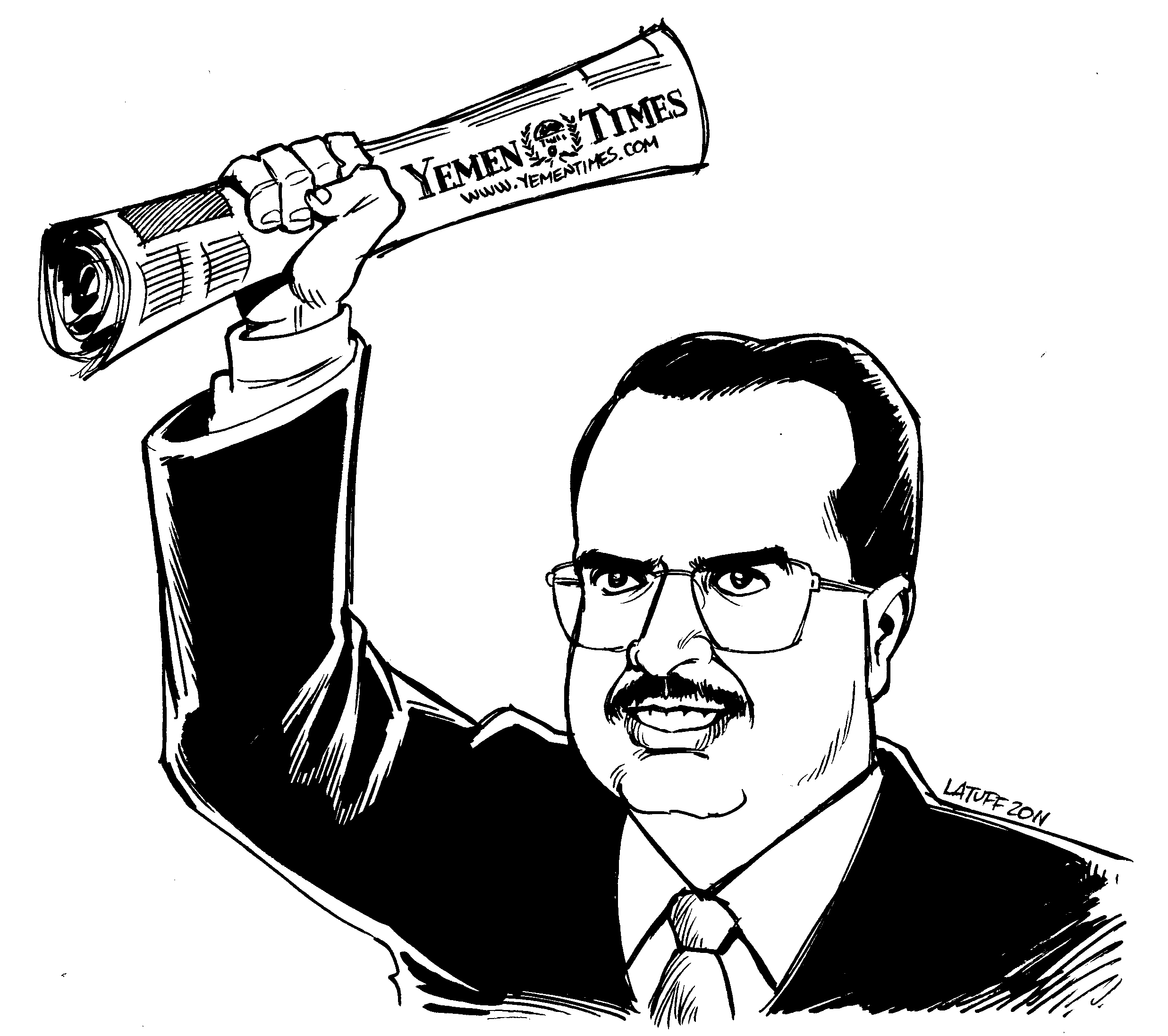
- Abdulaziz Al-Saqqaf by Carlos Latuff.
- Born: 24 October 1951
- Died: 2 June 1999 (aged 47)
- Occupation: Journalist

Professor Abdulaziz Y. Al-Saqqaf (24 October 1951 in Taiz – 2 June 1999) was a Yemeni human-rights activist, economist, and journalist. Saqqaf established the Yemen Times, unified Yemen's first and most widely read English-language independent newspaper, in 1991, and was the winner of the N.P.C.'s International Award for Freedom of the Press for 1995. He was also a leading economist at the state-owned Sana'a University. He won the lifetime Achievement Award of the 2006 Middle East Publishing Conference in recognition of his efforts in promoting freedom of the press in Yemen and in the region. Dr. Saqqaf was killed in 1999 when he was hit by a motorist. Despite appeals by Dr. Saqqaf's heirs to re-open an investigation into the crash due to indicators that it may have been a carefully coordinated assassination, the authorities in 1999 refused to do so, resulting in a withdrawal from the trial proceedings against the car driver. Saqqaf's elder son Walid and younger daughter Nadia, who currently runs the Yemen Times, has mentioned on several occasions that they believe the crash was orchestrated due to their father's frequent critical writings against the former president of Yemen Ali Abdullah Saleh.

Dr. Saqqaf earned his doctoral degree in 1979 from the Fletcher School of Law and Diplomacy, Medford, Massachusetts. Of his many publications was a two part series on Islamic Economic Systems which he introduced as a subject while he taught at Sana'a University College of Commerce.
