= Singapore–Turkey relations =

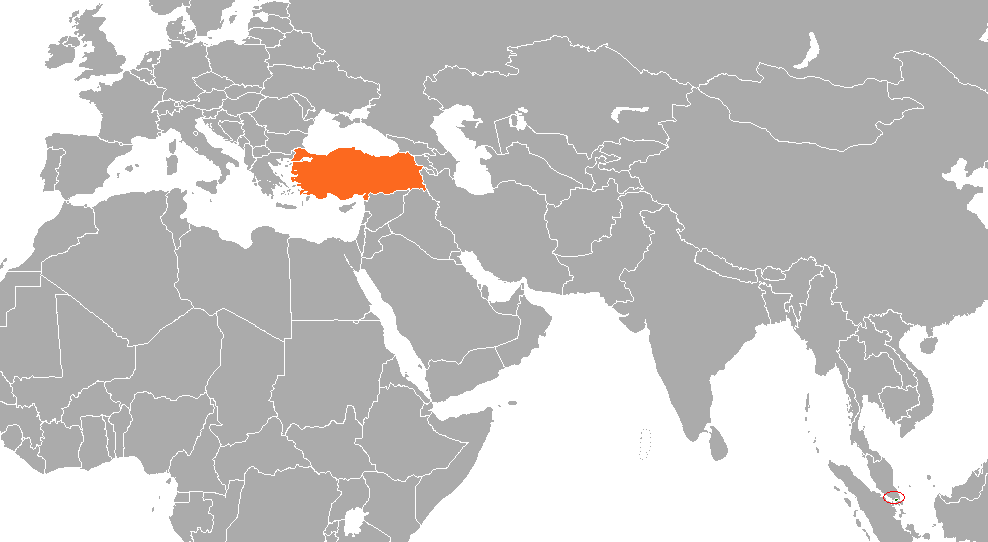
- Singapore: Turkey

Singapore–Turkey relations are the bilateral relations between Singapore and Turkey. Diplomatic relations between the two countries were established on 12 February 1969. Singapore has an embassy in Ankara. Turkey has an embassy in Singapore.

== Economic relations ==
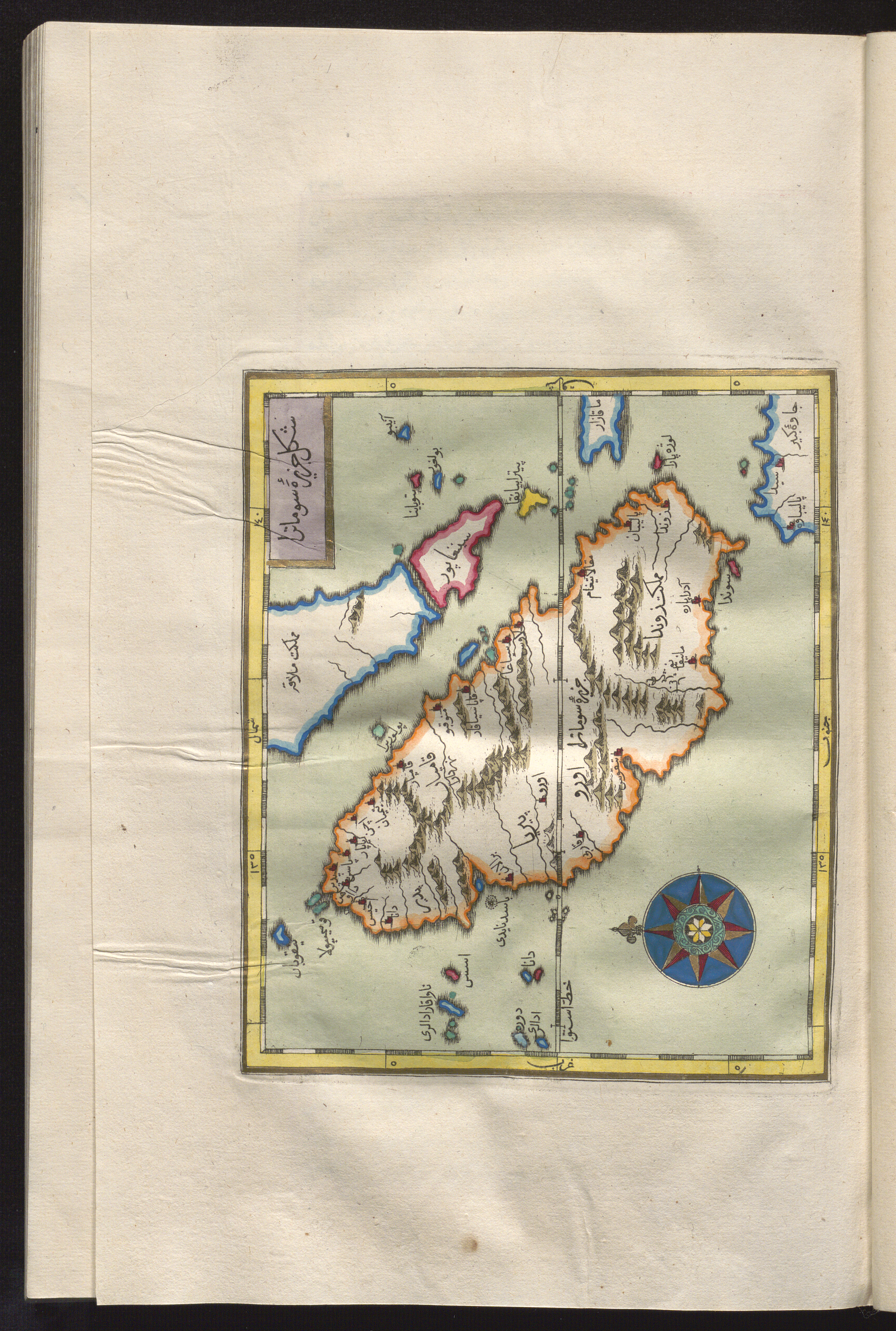
17th century Ottoman Turkish map showing Singapore in red (the main island shown is Sumatra)

Primary export products of Turkey includes iron and steel; mineral fuel oils; furniture bedding, lamps, fittings; boilers and parts; articles of apparel and accessories knitted. Turkish imports are mainly composed of postal packages and special transactions; electrical machinery and appliances; aluminum and plastic products.

During a visit by Singapore President SR Nathan to Turkey in 2009, the Union of Chambers and Commodity Exchanges of Turkey- Foreign Economic Relations Board (TOBB-DEIK) and Singapore Business Federation (SBF) concluded an agreement on the establishment of Turkey-Singapore Business Council. The council aims to promote bilateral trade between the two countries, as well as develop industrial and technological cooperation. Turkey and Singapore have agreements for “Avoidance of Double Taxation and Prevention of Fiscal Evasion with Respect to Taxes on Income” and “Reciprocal Promotion and Protection of Investments”.

Bilateral trade hit a record high in 2011 with total trade reaching S$2.2 billion in 2011, a 79 per cent increase from the previous year.

An FTA between both nations was signed in November 2015 and entered into force in October 2017 during the G20 Summit that year.

== State visits ==
In 2012, Turkish Deputy Prime Minister Ali Babacan visited Singapore where he met with Singapore President Tony Tan, Deputy Prime Minister Tharman Shanmugaratnam, Minister of Foreign Affairs K. Shanmugam and Minister for Trade and Industry Lim Hng Kiang. The two leaders agreed to further deepen bilateral cooperation across different sectors including trade, investments and finance. During the meetings, the leaders acknowledged the excellent state of bilateral relations between Singapore and Turkey. Babacan warmly welcomed Singapore's intention to open an embassy in Ankara later that year. They also exchanged views on regional developments in Asia and the Middle East.

H.E. President Erdoğan, then in his capacity as Prime Minister, visited Singapore on 8–9 January 2014. H.E. Prime Minister Lee visited Turkey on 12–15 October 2014. Prime Minister H.E Binali Yıldırım paid an official visit to Singapore on 21–22 August 2017.

== Migration ==
There are 500 Turkish citizens based in Singapore and over 50 Turkish companies registered in Singapore.

== Embassies ==
=== Embassy of Turkey, Singapore ===
The Embassy of Turkey in Singapore is the diplomatic mission of Turkey in Singapore. It is located in the Tanglin district of Singapore. The embassy promotes Turkish interests in Singapore and represents Turkey's political, economic, and cultural interests in the country. The embassy also provides consular services to Turkish nationals residing in or visiting Singapore.

The embassy offers various services, including visa application processing, passport renewal, and notary services. It also provides information and assistance to Turkish citizens in case of emergencies, such as natural disasters, accidents, or arrests. The embassy also works closely with the Turkish community in Singapore to provide support and assistance as needed.

The current ambassador of Turkey to Singapore is Mehmet Burçin Gönenli, who assumed his duties in April 2021. He is responsible for overseeing the embassy's operations and promoting strong bilateral relations between Turkey and Singapore.
