= Artega tribe =

Arab tribe in Sudan

The Artega are an Arab tribe in Sudan. They came from Hadramut around eight centuries ago, settling near Tokar. The name is said to mean "patrician."

They became princes Sawakin since 664 AH under Mamluk and the Othman Caliphate. They were all followers of the Mahdi and Khalifa in the Mahdist War (1883-1898).
