= Syed Abdul Rahman Alsagoff =

Arab businessman

Syed Abdul Rahman Alsagoff (Arabic: ٱلسَّيِّد عَبْد ٱلرَّحْمَٰن ٱلسَّقَّاف Saiyid ʿAbd Ar-Raḥmān Assaqqāf) was an Arab businessman in the spice trade, and a philanthropist who settled in Singapore. He was a descendant of the Islamic Prophet Muhammad.

== Personal life ==
Alsagoff was born in Hadhramawt, in present-day Yemen, Arabian Peninsula. He was Muhammad's thirty-third direct descendant, and had a son, that is Sayyid Ahmad. His residence in Singapore, described as "unusual", was located along Java Road.

== Career ==
Alsagoff arrived in Singapore in 1824, alongside his son. As such, Alsagoff is cited as the "first member of the Alsagoff family to settle in Singapore". Trading mainly spices, his son later established the Alsagoff Company in 1848. Alsagoff was successful in his career, and "dominated the spice trade in the region". He also promoted the welfare of other people.

== See also ==
- Alsagoff family
- Arab Singaporeans
