= Syed Mohamed bin Ahmed Alsagoff =

Singaporean businessman

Syed Mohamed bin Syed Ahmad Alsagoff (Arabic: سيد محمد بن سيد أحمد السقاف Sayyid Muḥammad bin Sayyid Aḥmad as-Saqqāf) (1836 – July 3, 1906) was an Arab Muslim born in Singapore who was known as Nong Chik.

== Civil career ==
Syed Mohamed was also involved in Singapore's civil service undertaking several diplomatic posts. The first post he held was the Ottoman consul, where the Osmanieh Order inducted him into their ranks after he became consul. Syed Mohamed was also asked to conduct diplomacy on behalf of the Sultanate of Aceh during its conflict with the Dutch.

== Personal life ==
Syed Mohamed was the most prominent member of the Alsagoff family. He received two land concessions from Sultan Abu Bakar of Johor; one in Kukup where he could print his own currency and the other in Kampong Nong Chik.

Syed Mohamed died on 5 July 1906. After his death, his sons developed the Bukit Tunggal Estate in the 1920s. The Madrasah Alsagoff Al-Arabiah (founded in 1912) was built according to his will.

== See also ==
- Arab Singaporeans
- Alsagoff family
- Sayyid
