= Ahmed Fadhl al-Qumindan =

Yemeni poet, composer, and military figure

Emir Ahmed Fadhl al-Qumindan CMG
- Arabic: أَحْمَد فَضْل القُمِنْدان
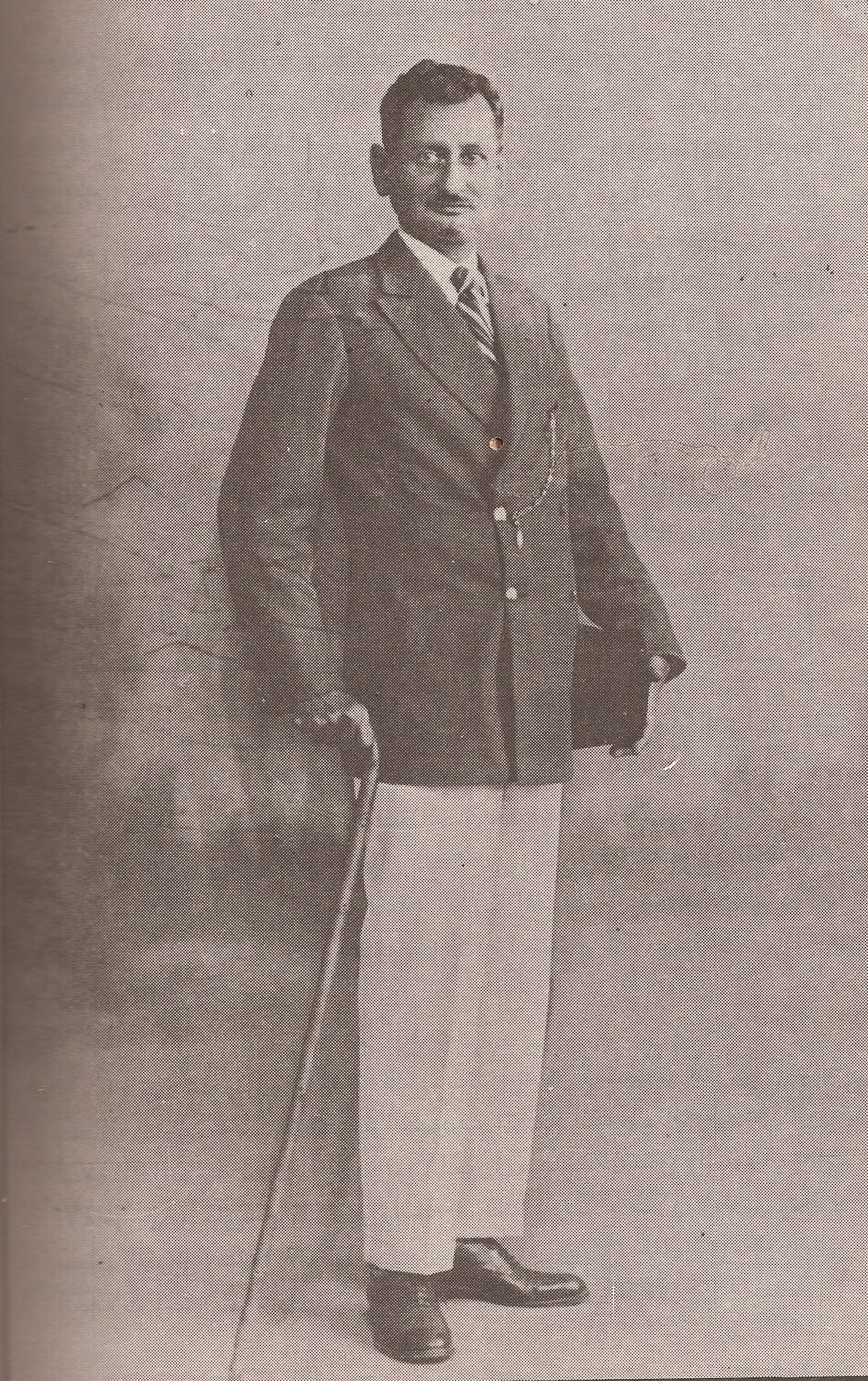
- Ahmed Fadl bin Ali bin Mohsen al-Abdali (1881–1943 AD)
- Born: November 23, 1881; Lahij, Sultanate of Lahej
- Died: August 1943 (aged 61); Tawahi, Aden Colony
- Occupations: Poet, composer, and soldier
- Spouse: Fatima Ahmed Fadl
- Writing career
- Language: Arabic
- Notable work: "Al-Masdar Al-Mofeed fi Ghenaa Lahj Al-Gadid" "Hadiyat Al-Zaman Fi Akhbar Mulok Lahj wa Aden"
- Notable awards: Order of St Michael and St George

Ahmed Fadhl Al-Abdali (Note: Arabic: أَحْمَد فَضْل العَبْدَلِي) (1881–1943), commonly known as "al-Qumindan", (Note: Arabic: القُمِنْدان) was a Yemeni poet, composer, and military figure belonging to the "Al-Abdali" family that ruled the Sultanate of Lahej during the British occupation of southern Yemen. Additionally, he was a historian and played a pivotal role in the agricultural renaissance of Lahij. Some even considered him as faqih. al-Qumindan played an active role in the establishment of the Arab Literary Club in Aden in 1925, holding various leadership positions over time. He is regarded as one of the most celebrated poets of the Yemeni dialect, with his oeuvre enjoying considerable popularity in Lahij and the surrounding regions. As a composer, he is regarded as the founder of modern Lahij music, which is regarded as one of the principal musical styles in Yemen, alongside Sanaani and Hadrami music.

One factor that contributed to his renown was the introduction of the phonograph in Aden, which facilitated the dissemination of his music to a wider audience. However, his work was subject to competition from Indian and Egyptian songs that enjoyed considerable popularity at the time. Furthermore, certain religious scholars in Aden and Lahij issued fatwas that prohibited music, specifically condemning al-Qumindan's songs. Nevertheless, this did not significantly impede the dissemination of his music.

In the present era, al-Qumindan is regarded as a pivotal figure in the cultural and literary renaissance that Aden underwent in the early 20th century. He assumed the role of establishing numerous educational institutions and literary forums and was a close associate of the Adeni Yemeni writer and lawyer Muhammad Ali Luqman. Despite occasional characterization as a vocalist, this perspective is not widely endorsed and is met with considerable opposition.

al-Qumindan's oeuvre comprises a single poetry collection, entitled "Al-Masdar Al-Mufid Fi Ghina' Lahj Al-Jadid" "The Useful Source for New Lahij Songs". This collection encompasses the majority of his compositions, including 90 out of the 95 poems that have been attributed to him. While he is primarily recognized as a folk poet, al-Qumindan also produced several prose works. His most significant prose contribution is arguably his historical account of Aden and Lahij under British colonial rule, titled Hadiyyat Al-Zaman Fi Akhbar Muluk Lahij wa 'Adan ("The Gift of Time in the Chronicles of the Kings of Lahij and Aden"). Additionally, he authored a brief treatise, "Fasl Al-Khitab Fi Ibāhat Al-oud wa Al-Rebab" ("The Decisive Word on the Permissibility of the Oud and Rebab"), wherein he presents a legal argument in favor of music and cites the opinions of prominent Islamic scholars who deemed music permissible within sharia. In addition to these works, al-Qumindan produced several articles, some of which were included in the introduction to his poetry collection, published in 1938, while others appeared in the Fatāt Al-Jazīrah newspaper, which was published in Aden.

His compositions, which he did not perform himself, achieved considerable popularity in Lahij, Aden, and the surrounding regions during the 1930s and 1940s. The initial songs to be recorded were "Al-Badriyya," "Taj Shamsan," and "Hammahum 'Ala Al-Maṭir Ḥabib Nashwan." These were recorded by the German companies Odeon and Bedafun, as well as by the Adeni recording company Al-Taj Al-'Adani. The songs were performed by members of al-Qumindan's musical ensemble, including Fadl Muhammad Jubaili and Mas'ad bin Ahmed Hussein. In the present era, al-Qumindan is regarded as an integral component of the cultural heritage of Lahij . He is esteemed as a seminal figure in Lahij Governorate and the city of Al-Hawtah, where he is considered one of the most prominent poets and intellectuals.

== Life ==
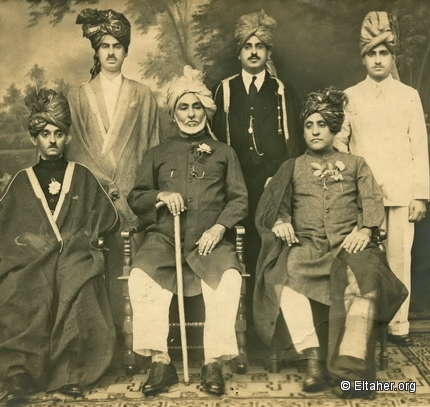
Fadl bin Ali Mohsen

=== Family ===
Ahmed Fadl bin Ali bin Muhsin Al-Abdali, a poet and prince, was born in the city of Al-Hawtah, which was the capital of the Sultanate of Lahej at the time of his birth. He spent the majority of his life residing in the city, maintaining a profound attachment to it. Historical records indicate that he was born in the year 1302 of the Islamic calendar, corresponding to 1884 or 1885 in the Gregorian calendar. However, alternative sources suggest that he was born in 1303 AH. Additionally, the poet himself mentions that he was born on the morning of the 15th of Sha'ban in the year 1299 AH, which corresponds to July 1, 1882.

His lineage can be traced back to the Al-Abdali family, who ruled the Sultanate of Lahij for over two centuries. The family's ascension to power commenced amidst the political upheaval following the dissolution of the First Ottoman Empire in Yemen. They established authority in Lahij and Aden as a sheikhdom in the 1730s. By the early nineteenth century, the Abdali Sultanate had become an ally of the British colonial powers in southern Yemen and was incorporated into the Aden Protectorate.

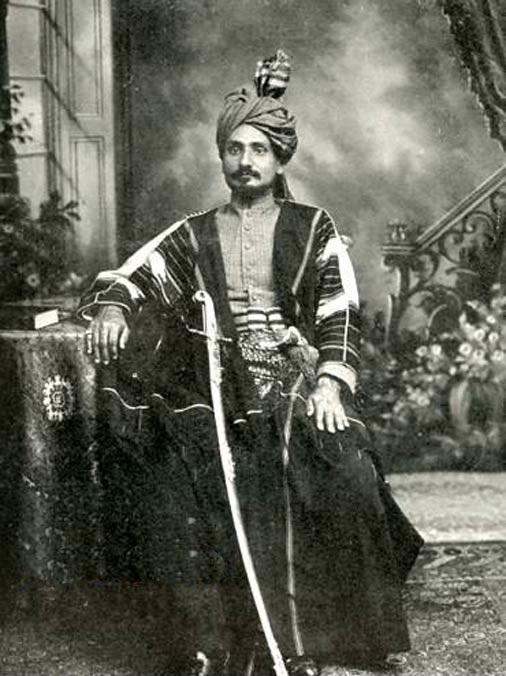
Abdulkarim Fadl bin Ali II

In his book Al-Sirah al-Mansurah, Sharf al-Din Hussein bin Hussein al-Rassi attributes the Al-Abdali family to the tribes of Lahij and its surrounding areas, citing the tribe as one of the primary sources of his lineage. In contrast, Judge Hussein Al-Arshi traces the lineage back to Arhab, located in the northern region of Sana'a. Imam Yahya Hamid al-Din, in a letter addressed to a Sultan of the Abdali, links the lineage to Bakil tribe. However, in his book Hadiyyat Al-Zaman Fi Akhbar Muluk Lahij wa 'Adan ("The Gift of Time in the Chronicles of the Kings of Lahij and Aden"), Prince Ahmed Fadl al-Qumindan presents a compelling argument against these claims, citing documents that trace the Abdali lineage to the Kalid tribe, one of Yafa'a tribes. Nevertheless, the Abdali family's connection to their tribal origins had long been severed, with Lahij becoming known as the land of the Abdali and the Abdali becoming associated with it.

His father was Sultan Fadl bin Ali Muhsin, who held the title of Sultan during two distinct periods. The initial period of his rule commenced in 1862, but it was cut short the following year, in 1863, when he abdicated the throne in favor of his uncle, Fadl bin Muhsin Fadl, as a result of a family dispute over succession. His second reign commenced in 1874 and concluded with his demise in 1898, spanning a period of 11 years. During this latter period, no one contested his rule, in contrast to the preceding period. Sultan Fadl bin Ali was responsible for selling the city of Ash Shaikh Outhman to the British government in Aden. During his reign, the lands of the Subayha tribe were annexed to the sultanate, although they later separated, and tensions rose between the Abdali and the Aqra tribes.

Ahmed Fadl al-Qumindan was raised under the care of his father until the latter's demise, which occurred when al-Qumindan was approximately fourteen years of age. In his writings, the poet speaks of his father, stating that he had a profound interest in knowledge and the company of scholars, engaging with them regularly. Initially, he attended Al-Hawtah Mosque, occupying the status of a student among his peers. He constructed an educational facility for the esteemed Sheikh Ahmed bin Ali Al-Salmi from Aslum in Lahij. He was known for his fairness and benevolence, to the extent that his successor, Sultan Ahmed, held him in low regard. When the Sheikh Othman region was sold to the British government, Sultan Fadl bin Ali reinvested the proceeds into the sultanate's treasury, rather than distributing them among the ruling family.

Following the demise of al-Qumindan's father, the throne was inherited by his cousin, Ahmed bin Fadl Muhsin Al-Abdali, who reigned from 1898 until 1914. This cousin, whom al-Qumindan refers to as "uncle" in his memoirs, assumed the responsibility of caring for him following his father's death. At one point, this uncle entered into a marital union with al-Qumindan, first with one of his daughters and subsequently with another daughter. Upon reaching the age of 19, al-Qumindan was appointed by his uncle, Sultan Ahmed Fadl Muhsin, to the role of commander of the regular army of the Sultanate. In his memoirs, al-Qumindan reflects on this appointment, noting that his uncle, Sultan Ahmed Fadl Muhsin, was a profoundly knowledgeable and enthusiastic individual. This ultimately led him to consider me for this pivotal role. His brother was Sultan Abdul Karim Fadl bin Ali Muhsin, who ruled from 1915 until 1947. During his brother's tenure, al-Qumindan once again assumed command of the army. He had another full brother named "Muhsin," who also held a role in his brother's rule and assumed certain political responsibilities and promotions.

The al-Qumindan family was the proprietor of a considerable tract of agricultural land, a portion of which was inherited, while another portion was procured through the purchase of the original owners. As the ruling family of the sultanate, they exercised considerable influence, unchallenged by other families, which they occasionally employed to unlawfully seize agricultural lands through means such as intimidation. This considerable wealth afforded them a comfortable and prosperous lifestyle, which, in turn, provided Ahmed Fadl al-Qumindan with access to knowledge and culture. Nevertheless, al-Qumindan was discontented with the prevailing conditions of oppression and social discrimination, not only in his region but throughout the Arab world. This sentiment is evident in an article he later wrote, entitled "An Arab Prince Describes the Arabian Peninsula."

The al-Qumindan family employed a Bedouin girl named Maryam, who served them in a nanny capacity and was entrusted with the responsibility of caring for the young al-Qumindan. al-Qumindan recalls that he derived solace from listening to her sing to him nightly until he fell asleep, at approximately three years of age. He was reared in an environment replete with knowledge, literature, and culture, and was profoundly influenced by the local popular dances and songs in his region, composing poetry from an early age. It is noteworthy that al-Qumindan exhibited the greatest joy and contentment during the ages of six and seven, a period of his life that was more jubilant than any other.

In his youth, he engaged extensively with a range of reading materials, including scientific and literary periodicals, as well as social and agronomy, in both Arabic and English. He also devoted considerable time to the practice of writing poetry and composing melodies. As a child, al-Qumindan contracted smallpox, but he recovered, although the disease left faint marks on his face that were not easily noticeable.

=== Education ===
Ahmed Fadl Al-Abdali received his initial education in reading and writing at his father's residence, the Sultan's palace. In approximately 1891, at the age of seven, his father enrolled him in the "House of Knowledge" (Dar Al-Ilm), where he attended two daily sessions. The morning session was dedicated to learning reading and writing, while the afternoon session focused on Tajwid and Quranic studies. His initial education was supplemented by teachings from several scholars in Al-Hawtah, most of whom had migrated from the northern part of Yemen. At that time, education was not widely accessible, so Al-Abdali studied in mosques and traditional schools (Kuttabs) in his city.

During this period, he and his cousins received instruction in Arabic grammar, Fiqh, and Hadith from Ahmed bin Ali Al-Salmi, who was the Mufti of Lahij at that time and held a certificate from the Zabeed Religious Institute in grammar, rhetoric, and religious sciences. Al-Abdali pursued further studies under Ali Al-Ahdal, the judge of Lahij, and also engaged in learning with scholars such as Qasim bin Abdullah Al-Salmi from Lahij, Alawi bin Ali Al-Haddad from Hadhramaut, and Taher bin Shaikhan Al-Habshi, also from Hadhramaut. Over the seven years of his studies, he memorized the Quran and acquired a comprehensive understanding of its sciences. He also received instruction in Hadith, Islamic sciences, grammar, syntax, logic, rhetoric, miraculous eloquence, arithmetic, music, history, and geography.

al-Qumindan did not have the opportunity to attend a foreign university, as no such institution had yet been established in Yemen during his lifetime. Additionally, he did not pursue studies at any higher institutes or other academic institutions. Nevertheless, he cultivated a sophisticated literary and musical sensibility and remained informed about the political developments in the Arab region by perusing a range of newspapers and periodicals published in Arab countries. He was particularly interested in the works of Mustafa Lutfi al-Manfaluti, an Egyptian writer of his era, as well as several pre-Islamic and post-Islamic Arab poets. He perused Ibn Khaldun's Muqaddimah and Al-Mutanabbi and Al-Sharif al-Radi. He held in high regard the poetry of Ahmed Shawqi, Abu Nuwas, and the Rubaiyat of Ilyas Farhat. Furthermore, he studied the works of Taha Hussein.

al-Qumindan acquired proficiency in the English language, both written and spoken, at a mission school in Tawahi of Aden. Additionally, he pursued English studies under the tutelage of Abdul Hamid Reza Riyadh, an esteemed elder educator. Following Riyadh's demise in 1897, al-Qumindan interred him adjacent to his grandfather, the Sultan and held a commemorative banquet in his honor. He, along with his sibling and cousin, pursued further studies in English at a private institution in Lahij, instructed by Saleh Jaafar Al-Ajmi, a resident of Aden, and Saleh Hassan Turki from Sheikh Othman.

=== Composition and music ===
Qamandan received instruction in musical instruments from four teachers who had migrated from Taiz in northern Yemen and settled in Al-Hawta. These teachers imparted to him the principles and fundamentals of music. These teachers were originally from the Levant and included the brothers Abdul Hamid and Rafiq Rida Riyadh from Aleppo, Said Takieddine al-Agasi, and Dadam al-Fayyad. Qamandan attributes the establishment of the foundational principles and style of modern Lahji music to these individuals.

He became proficient in playing the saxophone, bajel, fanion, and aynoo. Despite initially encountering difficulties in mastering the qanun, he eventually succeeded. Subsequently, he also became proficient in playing the Qanbus. Rather than using conventional musical notation to record his compositions, he employed a distinctive approach, transcribing melodies into verbal formats using the word "Dan" from "dandana," as exemplified by the phrase "Dana ala dana ya dan ya dana."

In his youth, the region witnessed the emergence of stringed instruments, particularly Al Sanʿani oud, preceding the advent of the Egyptian oud. Most musicians in the region, including Qamandan, hastened to master the San'ani oud. He became proficient in both San'ani melodies and local, traditional ones. When he endeavored to compose pieces based on these styles, a genre known as Lahji singing emerged. Qamandan is regarded by numerous historians as the founder of this genre, as his melodies were distinguished by their blend of the traditional and the modern.

Upon assuming command of the army, he recognized the need for a musical ensemble to accompany the troops. He was instrumental in acquiring brass musical instruments and music teachers, thereby facilitating the establishment of a military band. In the summer of 1927, the band was established and commenced rehearsing pieces in the English language. Qamandan set his celebrated poem, " I Bulbul Ghany Li w Eshgeny" 'O Bulbul, sing to me and cheer me up', to music, composing the melodies based on existing pieces. He continued to oversee the band's activities even after relinquishing his military command. At one juncture, he endeavored to enlist the Lahji artist Hadi Sbeet Al-Nubi in his ensemble, but Al-Nubi declined Qamandan's invitation. Qamandan continued his efforts to identify additional talent for his band, ultimately selecting two promising individuals. One of these became the lead singer, Fadl Muhammad Jabili, while the other assumed the role of oud and violin player, Mas'ad bin Ahmed Hussein.

The ensemble recorded two compositions by Qamandan: the national anthem of the Abdali Sultanate, "Nasheed Mahabat El -Watan" 'Anthem of Love for the Homeland', and the royal anthem, "Abdali Royal Prayer."

==== Members of the Al Qamandan Orchestra ====
Member	Role
Ahmed Fadl al-Qumindan	Conducting, songwriter, composer
Ibrahim Rasem	Second Conducting
Fadl Mohamed Al-Lahji	Singer, Oud player and Violin
Mosaad bin Ahmed Hussein	Singer, Oud Player
Hassan Tafash	Percussionist
Fadl Tafash	Percussionist
Abdulqawi bin Ali Saeed	Percussionist
Mohammed Saad Al-Sana'ani	Chorus
Saeed bin Ahmed	Chorus

=== Military ===
The relationship between al-Qumindan and the military has its origins in the era of his uncle, Sultan of Lahij, Ahmed bin Fadl Mohsen Al-Abdali. In approximately 1904, when al-Qumindan was approximately 19 years of age, his uncle appointed him as the leader of the regular army. One of the primary motivations behind this decision was al-Qumindan's proficiency in the English language, which would facilitate interactions with the Allied British forces stationed in Aden. At the time, the Sultanate had numerous treaties and agreements with the British.

After the demise of his uncle, Sultan Ahmed bin Fadl Mohsen Al-Abdali, who had been suffering from diabetes, on March 10, 1914, after a period of relative stability was brought to an end. This period was marked by intermittent clashes with neighboring tribes, including the Subayha, and sporadic confrontations with the Turks in northern Yemen. However, this period of relative calm was merely a precursor to the storm of World War I. During this war, Ottoman forces, led by General Ali Sait Akbaytogan, advanced towards Al-Hawta after seizing Al-Dhale. Their objective was to reach Aden, which was a British stronghold in Yemen.

The Sultanate's military forces, under the command of al-Qumindan, advanced to the vicinity of the village of Al-Dakim, near the Ottoman military units. A battle ensued at this location, resulting in the defeat of the Sultanate's forces. Aware of the formidable strength of the Ottoman combatants, al-Qumindan promptly withdrew to the capital. The Ottoman forces encountered minimal resistance from nearby villages as they advanced towards Al-Hawta, the capital of the Abdali Sultanate, and subsequently assumed control of the city. This occurred during the tenure of Sultan Ali bin Ahmed bin Ali Mohsen, who ruled for a mere one year and three months. In July 1915, the Ottomans captured Lahij, which resulted in the fall of the Sultanate into Ottoman hands. The Abdali family, including the poet al-Qumindan, sought refuge with their British allies in Aden.

Sultan Ali bin Ahmed bin Ali Mohsen died on July 15, 1915, in Aden. Abdul Karim Fadl bin Ali, brother of al-Qumindan, was subsequently appointed Sultan in exile in Aden, effectively becoming a Sultan without a Sultanate. Following the conclusion of World War I and the defeat of the Ottoman Empire and its Central Powers allies, Ottoman forces withdrew from Lahij in November 1918, enabling the Abdali Sultanate to reassert control.

The departure of the Ottomans resulted in a security vacuum in several parts of the Sultanate, prompting Sultan Abdul Karim Fadl bin Ali to establish a regular military force to maintain order, protect the Sultanate from hostile tribal raids, and combat banditry. He delegated this responsibility to his brother, al-Qumindan, who was appointed commander of the regular forces on Tuesday, March 8, 1920. This was the same day al-Qumindan departed from his residence in Aden, where he had resided throughout the Turkish occupation of Lahij.

However, the recently constituted military force lacked trained personnel, comprising only tribesmen and loyalists who had volunteered for service in a modern army. To construct this military force, al-Qumindan enlisted the assistance of several military trainers, including an English officer from the British Army in Aden, Captain Ward. In his poem "Call to Enlistment," al-Qumindan exhorted tribes, local leaders, and citizens of Lahij and the Sultanate to join the army. During his brother's tenure, the Subayha tribes in the Raga'a region resumed their attacks on caravans. However, the Sultanate's army, under al-Qumindan's command, besieged the city of Raga'a until the tribes surrendered to the Abdali authority.

One factor that facilitated al-Qumindan's role as army leader was his formation of a military band in early 1346 AH, which corresponds to the summer of 1927. He composed the lyrics for both the national and royal anthems, which were subsequently recorded by the band. Following the establishment of the military band, al-Qumindan relinquished his role as army commander. However, the title "al-Qumindan," a variation of the English "Commander," continued to be associated with him.

Before the Ottoman invasion of Al-Hawta, Ali Said Pasha, the Ottoman forces' commander, sent a message to al-Qumindan, requesting permission to pass through to Aden and attempting to gain his support. al-Qumindan declined the request and responded with a brief four-line poem, stating, "Time passes, and the ominous year arrives when Amirali Ali Said Pasha sends a letter requesting permission to pass through to advance to Aden and expel the infidel, as he claims." Despite the Ottoman incursion into Lahij, Ali Said Pasha persisted in maintaining communication with al-Qumindan, who was then based in Aden. He extended an offer of a senior position within his administration. al-Qumindan declined the offer and replied with another poem, this time offering a critique of the offer. Nevertheless, al-Qumindan later commended Ali Said Pasha's four-year tenure, characterizing it as equitable and noting that the Ottoman leader "devoted late nights to the public good and provided solace to the impoverished and disadvantaged." Additionally, he noted that upon the withdrawal of the Ottomans from Lahij, he and his brother embraced Ali Said Pasha, with tears streaming from his eyes.

Following the Ottoman occupation of Lahij, the Sufi poet Al-Hajj Ahmed bin Ibrahim Al-Habishi composed a poem in praise of the Ottomans, which also included mockery and gloating over the Abdali family and depicted their defeat and the Turkish victory. He dispatched the poem to Aden, addressed to Sultan Abdul Karim Fadl, his sibling. al-Qumindan replied with a six-line poem entitled "Greetings and Peace to Lahij." The Ottomans endorsed Sufism in Lahij, which prompted Al-Habishi to espouse their cause, despite his status as a resident of Sufyan village on the border with Al-Hawta.

=== Personal life ===
al-Qumindan entered into a marital union for the first time at a relatively young age with Fatima Ahmed Fadl, who was his cousin, before his uncle assuming the role of Sultan. Some sources indicate that this marriage took place when he was thirteen years old, suggesting that it occurred around 1897. However, other sources claim that he was fifteen at the time, placing the marriage around 1899. His first wife was barren. Following the demise of al-Qumindan's father, Sultan Fadl bin Ali, and the subsequent succession of Ahmed Fadl Mohsen, al-Qumindan's uncle and the father of his wife, the couple were wed.

During their marriage, both al-Qumindan and his wife contracted smallpox. Fatima died from the illness, while al-Qumindan survived. Following the death of his first wife, his uncle, the Sultan, arranged for him to marry her sister, Jumaa, who bore him two daughters.

al-Qumindan's two daughters, Fatima and Khadija, received education in Quranic studies as well as basic reading and writing skills under the tutelage of a teacher named Saeeda, who hailed from northern Yemen. Both daughters were talented singers; Fatima excelled in playing the violin, while Khadija was proficient with the oud. Fatima married Fadl Abdul Karim, the son of al-Qumindan's nephew, the Sultan, whereas Khadija wed their cousin, Ahmed Mahdi bin Ali. Despite his desire for a son, al-Qumindan did not have any male offspring.

Following his marriage, al-Qumindan settled in a two-story red brick residence located on the main street of Al-Hawta. His living quarters were on the upper floor, while the ground floor was occupied by a butcher shop owned by Ahmed Hussein. Ahmed's young son, Masad, was among the members of al-Qumindan's musical ensemble. al-Qumindan dedicated a portion of his home to his student singers, many of whom became integral parts of his music group.

After al-Qumindan's passing, his house underwent several transformations, serving initially as a courthouse and later as the headquarters for the workers' union. Eventually, the housing authority in Al-Hawta repurposed the building to provide accommodation for citizens under usufruct contracts. In contemporary times, the ground floor hosts various commercial shops. Throughout these changes, the house experienced numerous internal modifications, including partial demolitions and reconstructions, which some observers have criticized as encroachments on a significant cultural landmark of Lahij.

al-Qumindan's residence served as a prominent gathering place for scholars, literary figures, politicians, and historians from across Yemen. This dynamic intellectual milieu prompted the writer Fadl Awad Awzar to characterize the house as "a nexus for scientific, social, political, literary, and artistic inquiry." Notable figures who frequented the residence included military officers from Aden, prominent political leaders such as the Sultan of Al-Hawshab, and the esteemed Lebanese traveler and writer Ameen Rihani. Al-Rihani's interactions with al-Qumindan are immortalized in the poem "Ya Tayr Kuff Al-Niyah" ("O Bird, Cease Your Lament").

In his book Kings of Arabia, Amin Al-Rihani provides a detailed account of his visit to al-Qumindan in the early 1920s, offering insights into the poet's personality, appearance, and intellectual discourse. He lauded al-Qumindan's keen intellect, vast knowledge, and affable demeanor, noting, "I had the privilege of spending several days at the residence of the esteemed scholar Ahmed Fadl al-Qumindan in Lahij, engaged in comprehensive discourse across a spectrum of intellectual, historical, and artistic domains." "He was a man of keen intellect, vast erudition, and a rich cultural heritage. He was a delightful companion and a distinguished figure not only in Yemen but across the Arabian Peninsula." Al-Rihani bestowed upon him the title "The Poet and Philosopher of Lahij" and likened him to "the electric current energizing Lahij."

=== Agricultural reform ===
From an early age, al-Qumindan evinced a profound interest in agriculture and all aspects of gardening. In his formative years, he was entrusted with the management of his family's garden, spending a considerable amount of time in the fields and orchards. Subsequently, he acquired his garden, designated as the "Husseini Garden," which he frequently referenced in his poetic works. Following his departure from the military and subsequent relinquishment of leadership roles, al-Qumindan became profoundly engaged in the advancement of agriculture within the Lahij region. He proactively sought out methods to enhance agricultural production, immersing himself in a plethora of literature, including books, magazines, and bulletins—both Arabic and English—that focused on topics such as soil suitability for farming and the use of liquid pesticides to gradually, and sometimes completely, eliminate crop pests. Additionally, he researched the impact of weather and climate on crop growth.

In his endeavors to combat crop pests, al-Qumindan designated a portion of his "Husseini Garden" for experimentation with the efficacy of assorted pesticides, subsequently applying them to neighboring orchards and disseminating his findings to local farmers. He meticulously documented the outcomes of these experiments in a dedicated logbook.

al-Qumindan's contributions were not limited to pest control; he also introduced new varieties of fruits, Vegetables, and ornamental plants to the region. These were sourced from India, Egypt, and other countries, and included many varieties that had not previously been available in the region. He undertook a journey to India, during which he visited four distinct regions. Madras, Kolkata, Samra, and New Delhi. From these regions, he imported the majority of the fruits he introduced to his Husseini Garden, and the successful crops from his garden were disseminated to other orchards in Al-Hawta. The new produce he imported became available in fruit markets in Al-Hawta, Aden, Ash Shaikh Outhman, Al-Mualla, and Al-Tawahi—all areas within al-Qumindan's vicinity. However, the agricultural advancements he initiated did not extend beyond these regions during his lifetime.

Among the novel fruits he introduced were: Additionally, he introduced a variety of citrus fruits, including "Yusuf Effendi", Sugarcane, sugar bananas, Indian custard apples, Hapus mangoes, pomegranates, pineapples, jumbo, papayas, coconuts, and Razaki grapes. Additionally, he imported a variety of fragrant flowers, including jasmine, Jasminum sambac, Common sunflower, screwpine, daffodils, and carnations. During World War II, when the importation of betel leaves from India was halted—leaves that were commonly used by the Indian communities in Aden—al-Qumindan added betel to his list of crops to meet the market demand.

It is commonly accepted that implementing al-Qumindan's agricultural techniques resulted in the Lahij region attaining its pinnacle of prosperity during the 1930s and up until the mid-1940s. This led to the area becoming known as "Green Lahij." Additionally, it is postulated that Prince Ahmed Fadl was responsible for introducing Jasminum sambac to his "Husseini Garden" in Al-Hawta. This introduction is believed to have originated from India, subsequently establishing the region as the most renowned area for the cultivation and trade of jasmine in southern Yemen. Subsequently, the cultivation of jasmine proliferated in the other areas of Yemen.

al-Qumindan developed an agricultural calendar that delineated the optimal planting seasons for various crops and incorporated innovative irrigation techniques. This calendar served as a guide for local farmers in his region at that time. However, the information and instructions he compiled were handwritten on paper and never printed. As a result, a significant portion of his documented work has been irretrievably lost, including the original manuscript, which was kept in his home. It is uncertain whether this manuscript was misplaced when his possessions were transferred to his family's palace following his death or if it was misplaced during the final years of his illness.

In 1914, just before the onset of World War I, al-Qumindan established the "Husseini Garden." However, some sources suggest that the garden may have been created by al-Qumindan's father, the Sultan. The garden is situated approximately four to six kilometers from the city of Al-Hawta, with the village of Al-Kaddam located to the south and the village of Al-Khudad situated to the north. It is positioned in a fertile area between two valleys. The garden encompasses 300 acres, although some sources assert that it covers only 75 acres and that it employs up to 120 workers. Following al-Qumindan's demise, his nephew, Fadl bin Abdul Karim, assumed ownership of the garden. It remained under the stewardship of the family until the early 1960s, when the government of the People's Democratic Republic of Yemen, under its socialist administration, nationalized the property. It was not until the Yemeni unification in 1990 that the property was returned to the descendants of al-Qumindan.

Notable Arab figures, including the Lebanese writer Ameen Rihani, Egyptian scholar Mohamed El-Ghanymi Al-Taftazani, and Tunisian intellectual Abdelaziz Thâalbi, have visited the Husseini Garden. Furthermore, other noteworthy figures, including Saleh Jalbit and Ali Reza, also visited the garden. In November 1965, a delegation from the Kuwaiti magazine Al-Arabi also visited as part of their exploration of Lahij, which was featured in issue number 48 of the magazine.

=== Death ===
In the final years of his life, al-Qumindan experienced a profound depressive disorder, particularly in the two years preceding his demise. During this period, he was afflicted by both psychological and physical ailments. Despite his lifelong opposition to superstition and charlatanry, in his desperation, he turned to the very healers he had once condemned in his writings, seeking relief from his suffering. His struggle ultimately resulted in his death from an illness that baffled the doctors of the time.

al-Qumindan died in the early days of August 1943 (corresponding to the beginning of Sha'ban 1362 in the Islamic calendar) at 6 p.m. in a hospital in the city of Tawahi, where he had been receiving long-term treatment. The following morning, his body was transported to Al-Hawta, where he was buried in the Mosque of the State. His funeral was a military procession attended by a considerable number of citizens, journalists, political figures, and military leaders from Aden, in addition to his family and relatives. Among those who expressed their condolences was Mostafa el-Nahas Pasha, the then Prime Minister of Egypt.

A commemorative ceremony was held in Lahij forty days after the author's demise. In attendance were numerous literary figures and poets who had been acquainted with al-Qumindan. Delegations from Aden and Lahij, including the Sultan of Lahij and al-Qumindan's brother, Abdul Karim Fadl, who delivered a speech about his late brother, were also in attendance. The event took place in the square of Al-Hawta, where numerous poems were recited in tribute to the founder of Lahiji music. Among those who delivered eulogies were Abdullah Hadi Sbait, Mohammed Abdu Ghanem, Saleh Abdullah Bamafaa, the writer Youssef Hassan Al-Saidi, Prince Ali bin Ahmed Mahdi, who expressed his sorrow in a touching poem, Abdul Majid Al-Asnaj, who had engaged in poetic exchanges with al-Qumindan, as well as Saleh Faqih and Muhammad Ali Luqman.

Subsequently, Prince Ali Abdul Karim collated the poems recited at the memorial into a small booklet. The majority of these poems were authored by local poets from al-Qumindan's hometown, who did not attain the same degree of renown as he did. Subsequently, the literary club "Abu Al-Tayyib Camp," which was established in 1939, published a book in memory of Prince al-Qumindan titled "Pens of the Camp." This book was republished in 2007 by the University of Aden as part of their "Hundred Books on Aden" series, consisting of 97 pages, with an introduction by Alawi Abdullah Taher.

== Poems ==
=== Overview ===
Most of the poems composed by Ahmed al-Qamadan are included in his only collection, Al-Masdar Al-Mufid fi Ghina' Lahij al-Jadid. This collection contains a total of 90 poems of different lengths. Of these, 19 poems are written in Modern Standard Arabic and occupy pages 14 to 19 of the book. The rest of the collection consists of poems written in the Lahji dialect, which is a mixture of the Taizzi-Adeni and Yafi'i dialects. In addition, five poems are not included in this collection. It is noteworthy that many of the poems written in Modern Standard Arabic contain colloquialisms.

Although al-Qamadan's contributions to poetry may not seem extensive, his real impact lies in preserving the Lahji musical heritage in the face of the Indian and Egyptian songs that once dominated Lahij and Aden. He is credited with founding modern Lahji music and leading a revival of the genre that influenced all subsequent Lahji poets and musicians. To preserve his art and the musical traditions of Lahji, al-Qamadan encouraged the establishment of literary forums in his region, funded the opening of the first music school in Lahij, and used the wealth of his social status. The school produced several poets and composers who carried on his influence, including the renowned poet Abdullah hadi subait, the poet Abdul Karim Abdullah, and the singer-composer Fadl Muhammad al-Lahji.

Some critics argue against the notion that al-Qamadan founded Lahji lyrical poetry, claiming that he did not originate Lahji music, but rather developed and modernized it by incorporating new elements such as tashayeeh (religious songs) and balancing them within the melodies. His efforts are credited with popularizing Lahji music throughout Yemen in the 1930s. Whether al-Qamadan was the founder of Lahji music or merely a significant innovator remains a matter of debate among critics and scholars. Umar Abdullah al-Jawi argued that while al-Qamadan shared similarities with earlier Lahji musicians, he distinguished himself by creating new compositions rather than merely performing traditional ones. This view is supported by Muhammad Abdu Ghanem, who states in his book Shair al-Ghina' al-San'ani that al-Qamadan created many new Lahji songs. The study presented at the First General Conference on Cultural Heritage in 1974 also acknowledges al-Qamadan's role as a foundational figure in Lahji music, citing examples of his innovative melodies, such as his poem "Dam al-Hana Ya Qamri al-Bana".

In contrast, Muhammad Murshid Naji opposes this view, arguing that al-Qamadan's contributions were limited to developing existing traditions without creating innovations, although he acknowledges al-Qamadan's significant influence.

=== Poetic genres ===
Ahmed al-Qamadan excelled in composing various types of poetry, including muwashshah, and national and agricultural anthems. His most famous work, however, is his contribution to popular and colloquial lyric poetry, which was greatly enhanced by his talent for composing melodies. Most of his sung poems were set to music by him. Al-Qamadan was influenced by the Hammani style of poetry, a tradition he mastered after he visited Sanaa and his interactions with its poets.

Al-Qamadan's compositions were largely based on traditional Lahji folk melodies, but incorporated elements of San'ani, Hadrami, Yafi'i, and rural songs, creating a new musical genre in Yemen known as "Lahji music". Many consider al-Qamadan to be the founder of this genre, and his style was emulated by numerous Lahij poets. Among Yemeni musical forms, the San'ani style had the greatest influence on al-Qamadan's melodies. He adapted the San'ani muwashshah to develop the Lahji muwashshah, with his song "Sadaat 'Ayun al-Maha" being a prime example. This song blends traditional Lahji melodies with San'ani music, transforming a two-line verse into a quatrain and incorporating a muwashshah and chorus borrowed from the San'ani song "Wamugharrid Biwadi al-Dawr".

Some of al-Qamadan's poems are categorized as "Dan al-Dahif," a popular musical genre prevalent along the southwestern coast of Yemen. "Sadaat 'Ayun al-Maha," especially its opening lines, exemplifies this musical style. However, the song's muwashshah and conclusion do not fully conform to the Dan al-Dahif style. Other poems such as "Ya Haid Radfan" and "Asa Sa'ah Hani Bayn Aden wa Bambi" fit well into the Dan al-Dahif tradition, which is characterized by short vocal passages.

Al-Qamadan also mastered "Dan Ya Tair Kaf al-Niha," a style popular among the general public, especially farmers. His poem "Sari al-Hawa fi al-Husseini" is a notable example of this genre. In addition, al-Qamadan composed many poems in "Dan Ya Marhaban Bil-Haashimi," a form that uses various musical instruments and features different lyrical and melodic sections. Famous examples are "Dar al-Ladhi Tuha", "Min Lahzik al-Fattan" and "Ghazalan fi al-Wadi". The third edition of his collection includes four poems titled "Ya Marhaban Bil-Haashimi", which cover pages 47 to 51.

=== Nature in poetry ===
Ahmed al-Qamadan was known for his deep passion, bordering on affection, for agriculture. He spent much of his time in the fields during the harvest seasons, often retreating from the city to live in his private estate, the Hussaini Garden. After establishing "Dar al-Arayes," al-Qamadan resided there mainly during the harvest seasons, especially between December and January, turning the harvest into a celebration of folk arts, during which he recited his poetry.

The influence of nature on al-Qamadan's poetry was profound. Most of the terms and attributes he used to describe his beloved were drawn from agricultural contexts, and his poems often contain such language. His love for the beauty of nature is a central theme in much of his work, with a significant portion revolving around his cherished Hussaini Garden, which was a major source of inspiration for him. His romantic poetry often includes similes involving fruit and crops.

One of his most famous examples is the poem "Miliih Ya Zein", which was sung by Fadl Muhammad al-Lahji and later by the Yemeni artist Faisal Alawi.

Among al-Qamadan's poems with similar themes is "Wasim al-Khudood," in which he praises a youthful maiden, comparing her beauty and figure to ripe fruit ready for harvest and enjoyment. Another example is "Mahabbat al-Haql," written in classical Arabic, which describes the celebrations that accompany the harvest season and provides a beautiful description of the fields. In addition, his poem "Aan al-Hasad" praises the land and the harvest.

Other lyrical works by Al-Qamadan that share this thematic focus include

- Hali wa Anab Razeqi
- Bikir Ya Teen
- Aan al-Hasad
- Sadat Ouyoun al-Maha
- Ba Tihammam ala Shati' al-Buhaira
- Daam al-Hina
- Qafayt wa Anas'a al-Qama wa Dami Yasila

These poems reflect al-Qamadan's connection to agriculture and the nature of his surroundings.

=== Militarization in poems ===
The poet al-Qamadan has a long history with the military, beginning with his early role as the leader of his uncle's army when he was young. Following the destruction of this army by the Ottomans, he formed a new army for the Sultanate once it regained its sovereignty, assuming command a second time. His military career concluded when he relinquished leadership of the newly established army to focus on poetry and leading the musical ensemble he founded.

Despite his departure from military life, these experiences left a significant imprint on his poetry. Al-Qamadan's works frequently feature military references, phrases, and terminology, which reflect his battlefield experiences, despite his lack of formal military training. These terms are often employed for aesthetic purposes, except in some poems where he describes his battles with the Ottomans, including threats and warnings about potential conflicts with advancing Ottoman forces.

The employment of military language by Al-Qamadan extends beyond the domain of war-themed poetry into the realm of his personal and emotional life. He frequently compares love to a battlefield, portraying the beloved as an adversary. In these instances, he presents himself as a humble, submissive figure under the authority of his beloved, in contrast to the assertive, triumphant tone of his war poems. He uses military and official titles to describe his beloved, typically situating himself in a lower rank. The titles employed include "ruler," "hero," "shah," "sultan," "pasha," "lord," "kaiser," "duke," and "general."

Among the poems of Ahmed Fadl al-Qamadan with a military theme is "Talabna Allah Dhi Yaghfir wa Yirham," which was composed in response to the advance of Ottoman Army in 1333 AH (1915 AD). This poem is regarded as one of the earliest works attributed to him. In this work, al-Qamadan does not hesitate to taunt the Ottomans and issue warnings and threats, urging support against the Ottoman campaign. He vividly depicts the battles, portraying the Ottomans as surrounded. It is noteworthy that in this poem, al-Qamadan employs the term "Shawafi" in a sectarian context, a practice that is unusual for him. Various interpretations have been proposed to justify this usage beyond sectarianism.

Another poem by al-Qamadan, titled "Ya Rasooli," was written in June 1928. In it, he denounces the aerial bombardment of the British forces—along with their allies—on Al-Dhali under the pretext of removing the Zaidis from the region. In "Haid Radfan," he offers congratulations to Prince Nasr bin Shaif for the defeat of the Ottoman forces and lauds him for recapturing Al-Dhali and restoring it to his control. Furthermore, al-Qamadan composed a poem titled "The Call to Recruitment," written in Classical Arabic, in which he exhorts the citizens of Lahij and Tuban District to the Military service of the nascent al-Abdali Sultanate.

While the poet Ahmed Fadl al-Qamadan was displaced in Aden following the Ottoman invasion of Lahij, the Second Battle of Kut al-Amara took place in February 1917 in Iraq, in the Kut al-Amara district, during World War I. This battle was fought between British and Ottoman forces and resulted in the defeat of the Ottomans, who had been controlling the area before the battle.

In the same month as the battle, al-Qamadan composed the poem "Talabna Allah Dhi Yanzil wa Yarfa'" in response to a poem by the poet Abdullah bin Ali al-Yafi'i, which congratulated the poet's brother on assuming power. In his poem, al-Qamadan characterizes the battle as a struggle between the Iraqi people and the Ottoman occupiers. He offers his congratulations to the Arabs of Iraq on their victory and describes the joy and elation that, according to him, spread throughout South Arabia. The poem then proceeds to describe the defeats suffered by the Ottoman forces. It also includes a direct warning to the Ottoman commander in Lahij, Ali Said Pasha, threatening him with defeat and cautioning him about the inevitable fate awaiting all occupiers.

=== Political and Social Poetry ===
In addition to the discernible military themes in Ahmed Fadl al-Qamadan's poetry, a more nuanced socio-political commentary exists, which necessitates a closer examination for its full appreciation. This aspect of his work reflects a critique of the actions and neglect of officials and rulers within the Abdali Sultanate, as well as an attempt to draw attention to salient public issues and to urge those in power to alleviate the suffering of the people.

A substantial proportion of his poetry is devoted to portraying the challenges encountered by the general populace, encompassing local customs, traditions, and the circumstances of farmers engaged in agricultural labor, among other social aspects of life in Lahij. One such example is a poem he composed in the Islamic month of Rajab in the year 1344 AH (1926 CE) in response to the rising price and scarcity of fish in the markets. This poem, titled "Endama Oudema Al-Sayd", addresses the crisis with al-Qamadan humorously questioning whether the sea had dried up or if locusts had attacked the fish.

Another example is his poem titled "Fe Qadyat Al-Mawateer", which was written in 1928 and sent to Abdul Karim Hassan al-Ajmi, a close associate of his brother Sultan Abdul Karim Fadl. In this poem, al-Qamadan offers a critique of the government's failure to address the deficiencies in the transportation infrastructure. He highlights the deterioration of the roads and the resulting damage to the environment, as well as the noise pollution caused by vehicles. Additionally, he points out the lack of standardization in fares and the prevalence of vehicle breakdowns, which he deems as a significant problem.

One year later, al-Qamadan composed a follow-up poem, entitled "Tabe'a Qadyat Al-Mawateer", which addressed the same issues. These poems were composed subsequent to the government's replacement of the tram service, which connected the cities of al-Hawtah and al-Ma'alla, with automobiles. While automobiles were a more contemporary and efficient mode of transportation than the antiquated and deteriorated tram, the deplorable condition of the rugged, sandy roads imposed considerable hardship on the populace. Through these poems, al-Qamadan implored his brother, the Sultan, who was then on a sojourn in Basra, to repair the roads and enhance transportation services.

The relationship between poet Ahmed Fadl al-Qamadan and his community, as well as his involvement in politics and the military, has been a subject of significant debate among Yemeni writers and researchers interested in the musical heritage of Lahij. This debate reached its zenith during the period of the People's Democratic Republic of Yemen and markedly declined following the unification of Yemen.

Those who have examined al-Qamadan's poetry are typically divided into two groups. The first camp, led by the Yemeni critic and writer Umar Abdullah al-Jawi, who had a Marxist Left-wing politics, argued that al-Qamadan did not occupy a central position within the Abdali royal authority. In the view of al-Jawi, al-Qamadan dedicated his poetry to the service of the people, portraying him as a prince who did not exercise princely power but instead espoused a different form of leadership, namely that of dominating the throne of music and song in Lahij. Al-Jawi regarded him as a humble poet with a deep affection for the land and the countryside. This perspective was shared by other writers, including Fadl Awad Awzer, who had a personal acquaintance with al-Qamadan, and Ayash al-Shatari, who believed that al-Qamadan considered himself an ordinary citizen, sharing the same struggles as the people. They cited his poems that criticized and demanded action from government officials as evidence of his separation from the ruling class and his lack of actual influential power.

Those with opposing views challenge al-Jawi's interpretation. For example, Dr. Abu Bakr al-Saqqaf engaged in a debate with al-Jawi on this matter. While he concurred with al-Jawi regarding al-Qamadan's poetic abilities, he did not view him as entirely free from the influence of the British colonial power. Al-Saqqaf characterized al-Qamadan as a reactionary figure, closely associated with the Abdali Sultanate's court, and suggested that he was aligned with British political interests, much like his brother, who would become active whenever Britain needed him, as during the 1934 negotiations between British representatives and Imam Yahya's regime.

Additionally, the Yemeni poet Abdullah Al-Baradouni addressed al-Qamadan in his book, Culture and Revolution in Yemen. Al-Baradouni observed that al-Qamadan's affinity for music and singing represented a form of defiance against the norms of the ruling family, where vocal expression was not considered appropriate for an individual of his social standing. He likened al-Qamadan's defiance to that of Prince Ali Yahya Hamid al-Din, who openly opposed his father, the tyrannical Imam of the Mutawakkilite Kingdom. However, al-Baradouni also noted that al-Qamadan did not explicitly oppose the excesses of his family. Nevertheless, he acknowledged al-Qamadan's proximity to the general populace and his shared experience of their daily struggles. Additionally, al-Baradouni observed that, despite al-Qamadan's profound interest in music and singing, he also had political concerns.

=== Patriotism in poetry ===
It can be argued that the most renowned national poem composed by Ahmed Fadl al-Qamadan is the national anthem of the Abdali Sultanate, titled "Nashid Mahabbat al-Watan". Composed in classical Arabic, this anthem was performed by his military band to melodies he had composed. In the poem, comprising eight verses, al-Qamadan speaks on behalf of the citizens of the Abdali Sultanate, articulating his profound affection for Lahij and its Wadi Tuban, and his readiness to sacrifice his life for a homeland that is of paramount importance to him. Additionally, the poet pays tribute to his brother, the Sultan, in the poem's concluding lines.

Another notable poem by al-Qamadan is "Al-Du'aa al-Sultani al-Abdali," alternatively designated as the "Sultanic Anthem." The poem commences with laudatory verses directed towards the Sultan of Lahij, a member of the poet's own family. However, it also evinces a pronounced nationalistic sentiment. In this poem, al-Qamadan prays to God for the security and independence of the Sultanate, for prosperity, and for guidance to its rulers, expressing his hope for wise governance. In the poem "Al-Da'wah ila al-Tajneed", which he also composed, al-Qamadan endeavors to instill a sense of national pride and to encourage the youth of the Sultanate to esteem their homeland highly. He exhorts them to sacrifice their lives for it by joining the newly formed national army of the Abdali Sultanate.

Another example is the poem "Tal'at Anwar Lahij min Aden," which was composed to celebrate the return of his brother, the Sultan, from his trip to Europe. This is one of the earliest examples of Yemeni nationalistic poetry, wherein al-Qamadan's patriotism is discernible. In this poem, the poet addresses the Sultan, questioning him while drawing comparisons between the social and intellectual advancements of European regions, such as Switzerland, and the situation in Yemen. He then inquires as to whether the Sultan has returned with any enlightenment from Europe, to dispel the ignorance and backwardness that pervade Yemen. It is noteworthy that all of al-Qamadan's nationalistic poems were composed in classical Arabic.

The question of al-Qamadan's national allegiance, as reflected in his poetry, has been a topic of debate among scholars of his life and work. While some scholars posit that he was profoundly loyal to Lahij and the Abdali Sultanate, others contend that he was a proponent of Yemeni unity. Some scholars posit that his primary allegiance was to southern Yemen, while others contend that he espoused a broader Arab nationalist sentiment alongside his commitment to unity. This divergence in opinions can be attributed to the apparent contradictions evident in his poetic statements. Evidence of al-Qamadan's Arab nationalism can be found in his essay, "An Arab Prince Describes the Arabian Peninsula," in which he denounces the social injustices he perceived to be prevalent in Arab regions during that time. Al-Qamadan was profoundly influenced by the ancient Arab culture and heritage, both pre-and post-Islam, particularly in literature and poetry. His poetry frequently evinces an affinity for Arab identity. In addition to the poem he wrote following the defeat of the Ottomans in Iraq, in which he celebrates the Arab victory, al-Qamadan frequently mentions various Arab countries in his verses. Some of his poems contain clear indications of his Arab nationalist consciousness, such as "Al-Faqeed al-Adheem", which he composed for the memorial of King Ghazi bin Faisal, the King of Iraq.

There is a divergence of opinion as to whether al-Qumindan can be considered a proponent of broader Arab nationalism or Yemeni unity. Conversely, some posit that he exhibited a pronounced regional Southern identity, with some even characterizing him as an ardent proponent of the Abdali Sultanate and its ruling family. Among the critics of this perspective is the Yemeni scholar Abdul Aziz Al-Maqaleh, who shares this view with the Yemeni writer Abu Bakr Al-Saqqaf. Al-Saqqaf posits that al-Qumindan derided the notion of Yemeni unity in his poetic works. In his book Shir al-Ghina al-San'ani ("The Poetry of Sana'ani Songs"), Muhammad Abd Ghani posits that al-Qumindan even rejected Zaydi influence in the arts. Similarly, Mohammed Murshid Naji offers a concurrence with this assessment of al-Qumindan's profound affiliation with Lahij.

These critics reinforce their argument regarding al-Qumindan's separatist tendencies by referencing the historical context of the 1930s, a period when Yemeni national identity was largely absent. At that time, there was no significant allegiance to a unified South Arabia, as the region was fragmented into various small states, sultanates, and sheikhdoms. The aforementioned critics reinforce their argument with specific lines from al-Qumindan's poetry that they believe unequivocally demonstrate his allegiance to Lahij. One illustrative example is two verses from his poem "Al-Badriya," which they interpret as a rejection of both Sana'ani influence and Zaydi dominance, even within the realm of the arts.

In contrast with previous interpretations, the Yemeni writer Omar Al-Jawi posits that the verses in question do not constitute a threat to Yemeni unity. He interprets al-Qumindan's expressions as an expression of natural pride in Lahji art, driven by a desire to see it surpass Sana'ani art. In Al-Jawi's view, the verses in question do not necessarily indicate al-Qumindan's separatism or a nationalistic bias towards Lahij. Similarly, Ayyash Al-Shatari underscores al-Qumindan's dedication to the concept of Yemeni unity. He asserts that while al-Qumindan celebrated Lahij and its fields, this was simply because it was his birthplace and does not negate his broader Yemeni identity. Al-Shatari attributes any interpretations of separatism to al-Qumindan's animosity towards the Imamate regime, which he believed had plunged North Yemen into darkness and backwardness.

Fadl Awadh Awzir presents an alternative interpretation of the frequently referenced verse from al-Qumindan's poem "Sadat Oyoun Al-Maha". Awzir posits that al-Qumindan's rejection of regionalism and sectarianism when he denied being from Sana'a or Isfahan was a fundamental aspect of his identity. In this verse, Awzir asserts that al-Qumindan was combating tribalism and regional bias, whether directed towards Sana'a or any other region. Furthermore, Awzir posits that a cultivated poet such as al-Qumindan, who journeyed to numerous Arab nations and engaged with their intellectuals, could not be confined to a regional or sectarian perspective. He highlights al-Qumindan's Arab nationalist sentiments alongside his Yemeni unification, as evidenced by the poet's expressions of anguish and distress in his works concerning the dismal Arab reality.

These views are supported by verses that reinforce the notion of al-Qumindan's commitment to Yemeni unity. It is noteworthy that some of these verses are present in the same poem from which certain excerpts are used to argue for al-Qumindan's separatism. To illustrate, in the poem "Talat Anwar Lahij min Aden", which al-Qumindan recited on the 4th of Muharram 1343 AH following his brother Sultan's return from Europe, there are sections that reflect al-Qumindan's Yemeni identity and national pride.

=== Critical interpretations ===
The majority of al-Qumindan's poetic oeuvre comprises straightforward songs and well-known folk tunes that extol the splendor of nature and the agrarian way of life. These compositions lack any profound symbolic connotations or interpretative nuances. Nevertheless, a minor proportion of his oeuvre, most notably the intricate and renowned poem "Al-Badriya," has given rise to considerable debate and a multitude of conflicting interpretations. In this poem, al-Qumindan employs a series of geographical references to describe a beautiful girl traversing various locations around him, from Lahij to Aden. In the poem, the poet portrays the female figure as ruling over the city of Al-Majrad (now known as Khormaksar), sailing the seas as the mistress of a fleet, and finally, symbolized by a beacon of fire on a mountaintop. Subsequently, the poet exhorts the reader to seek counsel from learned individuals regarding the true identity of the girl, acknowledging his lack of knowledge on the matter.

Several interpretations have sought to ascribe a specific meaning to this enigmatic figure. Some view her as a representation of a homeland, while others perceive her as embodying a particular ideology. In a comprehensive study on the folk heritage of Lahij, published in conjunction with the "First General Conference on Literature and Folk Heritage" in 1974, the authors posit that al-Qumindan's beautiful maiden symbolizes scientific socialism and Leninist thought. The study states, "Here, he sings of socialism, representing it as a beautiful maiden, despite the natural conditions and the state of the world during World War I, which ravaged humanity. The poet expresses the feelings of his society not as a prince, but as an ordinary individual, portraying his Badriya as a call for socialism in its highest sense, and refers to scientific socialism as established by the late comrade Lenin...". In one of the verses of his poem "Al-Badriya," al-Qumindan refers to Vladimir Lenin, the leader of the Bolshevik Revolution.

Before World War I, Saint Petersburg was known as Petrograd. This interpretation of al-Qumindan's work was, however, rejected by Muhammad Murshid Naji, who found the idea of al-Qumindan's belief in scientific socialism to be implausible. Naji posited that, given the socio-political context of Yemen during the 1930s, it was implausible for any individual, regardless of their educational background, to espouse the tenets of scientific socialism. He further argued that if al-Qumindan's national consciousness had not even reached the level of believing in Yemeni unity, it was even less probable that he would espouse communist beliefs.

In a similar vein, writer and journalist Ahmed Mahmoud Al-Salami posited that the ascription of communist characteristics to al-Qumindan by the intellectual and poetic elite of the period was likely a strategic maneuver. As Al-Salami posits, this was a strategic move on the part of the intellectuals and poets of the period to present al-Qumindan in a favorable light to the communists of the ruling Socialist Party in southern Yemen, thereby dispelling any negative connotations associated with his position as a member of the deposed royal family. This portrayal was intended to facilitate the publication and preservation of al-Qumindan's works, thereby protecting his artistic legacy from potential harm.

Mubarak Hassan Al-Khalifa proffered an alternative interpretation, proposing that in "Al-Badriya," al-Qumindan may have been alluding to Yemen as a whole, encompassing both the north and the south. Al-Khalifa highlighted that certain elements of the poem suggest that the poet was alluding to what he considered his homeland, leaving open the possibility that "Al-Badriya" could also represent only Lahij rather than all of Yemen.

=== Influence ===
The considerable influence and preeminent role of Al-Qamadan's poetry and compositions were largely confined to the artists and poets of Lahij. While his influence was somewhat constrained beyond the domain of Lahij music, the innovations he introduced in poetic and musical styles left a profound imprint, prompting some to regard him as the seminal figure in the development of Lahij music. His distinctive style was emulated by numerous poets, composers, and artists hailing from Lahij. The educational institutions he established for the teaching of music resulted in the emergence of a generation of writers and singers who perpetuated his legacy and showcased the brilliance of his musical style. Among these were Ahmed Saleh Isa, Ahmed Abbad Al-Husseini, Hamoud Saleh Naaman, Salem Zain Adas, Salem Ali Hujairi, Saif Ahmed Salooh, Saleh Saeed Naseeb, and Prince Saleh Mahdi Al-Abdali (who succeeded him in leading the Sultanate's The following individuals are also worthy of mention: Abdullah Salem Bajhel, Abdullah Hadi Sabeet, Ali Awad Mughlis, Mohammed Saad Abdullah, Mahmoud Ali Al-Salami, Mahdi Ali Hamdoon, Nasser Ahmed Abdullah Al-Makabi, Faisal Alawi, Salah Nasser Kurd, and Abbas Al-Dailami. Additionally, he is credited with introducing specific musical instruments to Lahiji music, including the Sanaani oud, which subsequently became a central element in this art form.

Following al-Qumindan's demise and the waning of his creative output in the 1940s, the 1950s witnessed the advent of poets and artists who could be regarded as his successors. These figures, including Abdullah Hadi Sabeet, Fadl Mohammed Al-Lahji, and Salah Nasser Kurd, perpetuated his musical legacy by carrying forward his melodies and lyrics, thereby contributing to the emergence of a new musical genre in Yemen. al-Qumindan's influence was not limited to the aforementioned Lahiji poets; his melodies and poems were disseminated throughout Yemen during his lifetime, even reaching Yemeni emigrants in Indonesia (mostly of Hadrami origin). These emigrants were particularly drawn to modern Lahiji music, and their poets composed songs and melodies based on the works they received. One of the most renowned poems inspired by al-Qumindan's melodies is "Yaqul Bin Hashim Bakata Al-Ayan Dam," authored by Hadrami poet Haddad Bin Hassan Al-Kaf during his exile in Indonesia. This poem is based on the melody of al-Qumindan's poem "Min Baad Ma Sar Al-Hali Qalbi Tab."

The influence of al-Qumindan on Gulf music is more recent, with his traditional melodies having a subtle impact on Gulf art. Notable Gulf artists who have performed al-Qumindan's melodies and poems include Abdul Mohsen Al-Muhanna, who sang "Ya Munyati Ya Sala Khatri" to the tunes of Yemeni musician Taha Farie, and Ibrahim Habib, who performed "Ghuzlan Fi Al-Wadi," with lyrics and music by al-Qumindan.

=== Criticisms ===
In the 1930s, the poet al-Qumindan published his only collection, Al-Masdar Al-Mufid fi Ghina' Lahij al-Jadid ("The Useful Source in the New Lahji Song"). At this time, he was at the height of his fame. His poetic works were widely admired by the general public and intellectuals in Aden and the surrounding regions. Nevertheless, his work also attracted considerable criticism from several sources. Religious scholars, who perceived his romantic poems as encouraging immoral conduct and observed explicit allusions to alcohol consumption and a disregard for religious practices, constituted a significant portion of his detractors. Some of these scholars were vehemently opposed to all forms of music and singing.

In response, al-Qumindan published a pamphlet titled Fasl al-Khitab fi Ibahat al-Oud al-Rabab. In this text, he sought to defend both himself and music, arguing that singing was not contrary to Islamic principles. A notable controversy emerged involving Sheikh Muhammad Salem al-Bayhani, who engaged in a fierce dispute with al-Qumindan over his poetry. The two exchanged accusations through articles published in the newspaper Fatat Al-Jazirah, which was based in Aden.

The criticism al-Qumindan faced was not limited to religious objections. His innovative approach to popular music, which aimed to blend traditional folk elements with new influences, such as the introduction of string instruments like oud, also faced resistance from some literary circles. These critics viewed his efforts as an attempt to obscure and distort traditional Lahji music.

The influence of al-Qumindan on Lahji music is now widely acknowledged. However, contemporary scholars continue to debate whether he should be regarded as the founder of modern Lahji music or as a significant innovator who made a substantial contribution to its evolution. Al-Qamndan's poetry in Classical Arabic is often critiqued for its lack of robust sentence construction and the prevalence of words with colloquial origins. Additionally, his verses are frequently observed to exhibit a lack of strict adherence to meter and the presence of irregularities in rhythmic structure.

al-Qumindan's Classical Arabic poems are often the subject of criticism, either for perceived deficiencies in quality or for the use of colloquial terminology. Even when they eschew colloquialisms, their style frequently evinces a proclivity towards colloquial poetic forms rather than those of traditional Classical Arabic poetry. This has led Yemeni writer and critic Abdulaziz Al-Maqaleh to describe al-Qumindan as "a poet who is attempting to write in Classical Arabic as a form of imitation or copying, and who is attempting to achieve a purely popular effect." Similarly, Mohamed Marshad Naji characterizes the poet in his book Al-Ghina' al-Yemeni al-Qadeem wa Mashahiruhu ("Old Yemeni Music and Its Celebrities") as writing Classical Arabic poetry "as if he were composing colloquial poetry, with a degree of pretense that is amusing rather than satirical."

al-Qumindan's Classical Arabic poetry is less popular and widespread than his Haimi colloquial poems, which have a broader reach and larger audience in Yemen and the Arabian Peninsula. Typically, his Classical poetry is met with neglect, although there are a few exceptions of popular pieces such as "Mahabbat al-Haql", "Al Nasheed Al Watani Llsaltana Al-Abdali", and "Al Salam Al Sultany".

== Writings ==
=== Al-Masdar Al-Mofeed ===
"Al-Masdar Al-Mofeed Fe Ghenaa Lahij Al-Gaded" is the title of the first and only diwan collection by Ahmed Fadl al-Qumindan. This collection includes the majority of poems he composed throughout his literary career, totaling 87 poems of varying lengths. The collection was compiled and published by his friend and second-in-command of his musical troupe, Ibrahim Rasim. The poems in the collection are written both in classical Arabic and in his local dialect, with the former being significantly fewer in number. The classical Arabic poems occupy pages 14 to 19 of the 157-page collection (based on the second edition published in 1983), consisting of 19 poems. These classical works are often overlooked and are less popular compared to his more widely recognized and celebrated folk poetry, which makes up the remaining 68 poems in the collection.

The poetry collection, initially published in 1938 under the title Al-Aghany Al-Lahjia "Lahji Songs" by Al-Hilal Press in Aden, was later revised and expanded by the author, who added new poems and republished it under the new title The Useful Source of New Lahj Songs through Fattat Al-Jazira Press, also in Aden. After this, several modern editions of the collection have been published.

The initial modern edition was released in 1983 in Aden by Dar Al-Hamndani, edited and prepared for publication by Awad Ali Bajnāḥ, comprising 153 pages. The third edition was published in Sharjah in 1989 by the Arab Culture House for Publishing, Translation, and Distribution. This edition was based on the compilation and preparation by Ibrahim Rasim, with annotations by Awad Ali Bajnāḥ and a review and introduction by Khalid Muhammad Al-Qasimi. It comprises 176 pages. Subsequently, the edition was reprinted in 1993 by Dar Al-Hadatha in Beirut. In 2006, the fourth edition of the collection was published in Sana'a by the Abadi Center for Studies and Publishing, edited and prepared by Ibrahim Rasim, comprising a total of 238 pages.

=== Hadiyat Al-Zaman ===
"Hadiyat Al-Zaman fi Akhbar Muluk Lahj wa Aden" is a political and historical work authored by Ahmed Fadl al-Qumindan. The book presents a detailed account of the political events and conditions in Yemen, with a particular focus on the emirates and sultanates in South Yemen, specifically Lahj and Aden, during the British colonial period. Additionally, the text chronicles the history of the ruling Qamandan family (Al-Abdali dynasty) from ancient times until the death of Sultan Ali bin Ahmed bin Ali Mohsen, the fall of the Abdali Sultanate to the Ottomans, and the Ottoman occupation of its capital, Al-Hawta. This ultimately resulted in the Abdali family's exile to Aden. The book is regarded as a pivotal source and historical document for those engaged in research on the history of Lahj and Aden during the periods it covers.

In its initial sections, the text examines the historical development of Lahj Aden and the surrounding region, as well as the agricultural heritage of Tuban District and Al-Hawta. In the sixth chapter, the author endeavors to ascertain the ethnic origins of the tribes that inhabit Lahij. Subsequently, the book provides an account of Yemen's history from its ancient civilizations through the advent of Islam, the eras of various Caliphate, the Sulayhid dynasty, the independence of the Rasulids, the emergence of the Tahirid Sultanate, and Ottoman rule, culminating in the British occupation of southern Yemen. The book provides a detailed account of the political and military history of Lahj and Aden during the period of British occupation. Chapters sixteen through nineteen are devoted to an examination of the impact of World War I on Yemen, the Ottoman forces' attack and subsequent occupation of Al-Hawta, the ruling family's refuge in Aden under British protection, and the eventual defeat of the Ottomans and the Abdali family's return to Lahj.

In composing "Hadiyat Al-Zaman," al-Qumindan drew upon a diverse array of sources, including English works by British historians and explorers who held administrative and military roles in Aden, as well as references that document the Imamate system in northern Yemen. Additionally, he consulted documents belonging to his ancestors. Among the most significant Western sources al-Qumindan relied on were the works of English historian R.L. Playfair, who served as an assistant to the High Commissioner in Aden for 18 years. In this capacity, he gathered information from elders and reviewed old documents held by Aden's rulers. Of particular note is Playfair's A History of Arabia Felix or Yemen, which exerted a considerable influence. Additionally, al-Qumindan consulted the work of Colonel Harold Jacob, a British political figure and personal acquaintance, entitled Kings of Arabia. Additionally, he referred to the ninth volume of A Collection of Treaties, Engagements, and Sanads Relating to India and Neighboring Countries, which was compiled by Sir Henry Mortimer Durand, the second secretary to the Government of India. About Arabic sources, al-Qumindan made use of historical accounts of the Imamate in Yemen and documents belonging to his ancestors, which were preserved by certain families in Lahj.

In the preface, al-Qumindan states that his motivation for writing the book was to counter the efforts of those who sought to distort the historical facts of the region. His objective was to set the historical record straight and correct both overt and subtle inaccuracies. Nevertheless, al-Qumindan has been the subject of criticism for what has been perceived as a lack of impartiality in his account of events. On occasion, he disregards or excludes data that might reflect poorly on his family, prompting scholars to exercise caution when examining his account of his family's history. The original manuscript is handwritten in an organized manner, using both red and black ink, and incorporates genealogical charts of his family. At the outset, al-Qumindan had no intention of publishing the book; his only objective was to print a limited number of copies for distribution among his family members.

The book comprises a brief preface, followed by nineteen chapters, and concludes with an epilogue. The first publication of the book was in 1351 AH (1931 or 1932 AD) in Cairo by the Salafi Printing Press and Library. The second edition was published in 1980 in Beirut by Dar Al-Awda. The third edition was published in Cairo in 1997 by Maktabat Al-Thaqafa Al-Diniya, followed by a fourth edition in 2004 in Sana'a, published by Maktabat Al-Jeel Al-Jadeed. The text was edited, verified, and annotated by Abu Hassan Khalid Aba Zayd Al-Adhra'i, resulting in a 362-page volume.

=== Fasl Al-Khitab ===
In his concise booklet, "Fasl Al-Khitab fi Ibaha Al-Oud wal-Rabab", Ahmed Fadl al-Qumindan presents both religious and rational arguments in response to several articles that suggested the prohibition of singing and music. The articles in question were published in the Fatat Al-Jazirah newspaper, which was issued in Aden and served as a frequent platform for al-Qumindan's poetry and articles. Furthermore, the booklet functions as a refutation of a book by the Hadhrami scholar Mohsen bin Mohammed Al-Attas, entitled Ruqyat Al-Musab bil-Oud wal-Rabab, in which Al-Attas denounces the use of musical instruments. Furthermore, al-Qumindan addresses several fatwas from northern Yemeni scholars who had previously issued similar prohibitions.

al-Qumindan composed and published the booklet during the 1940s in Aden, with the first print occurring in 1938 and a subsequent edition in 1941. At that time, his musical compositions were widely popular, particularly in Aden and its surrounding areas. His only poetry collection had already been published and was well-received in the local markets. Therefore, the city of Aden did not require a booklet to defend music. However, the objective of this work was to refute fatwas that prohibited music and singing, particularly those issued by scholars in northern Yemen, where the prohibition of music was prevalent during the 1940s under the authoritarian rule of the Imams. Some have postulated that al-Qumindan's publication of this booklet was part of a broader campaign against the Imamate system in the north, with the book carrying both political and religious undertones. Nevertheless, the book did not receive significant attention from northern scholars, and none of them responded to it.

Regarding the legal arguments and hadiths that al-Qumindan believed explicitly permitted listening to music, he drew upon several sources and books by well-known jurists, citing their opinions at length. However, his principal source was "Nihayat Al-Arab fi Funoon Al-Adab" by Shihab al-Din Aḥmad bin ʿAbd al-Wahhab al-Nuwayri, a jurist from the 8th century Hijri. al-Qumindan concentrated his attention on the fourth volume, in which Al-Nuwayri devoted approximately 70 pages to an analysis of the opinions of jurists on the matter of music. Al-Nuwayri presents the arguments of both those who oppose and those who support the use of music, with a greater emphasis on the latter. al-Qumindan followed this approach by elaborating on the evidence supporting the permissibility of music while briefly addressing the opposing views. He advanced the argument that the hadiths invoked by those who oppose music were fabricated and unreliable, basing this claim on Al-Nuwayri's opinions. Furthermore, al-Qumindan drew upon the works of Imam Al-Shawkani, particularly Nayl Al-Awtar, specifically the chapter on "Bab El Lahw W Al-Dof," where a significant portion of his booklet consists of excerpts and summaries of Al-Shawkani's views. Additionally, he referred to Asbab Al-Nuzul by Al-Suyuti and Al-ʿIqd al-Farīd by Ibn Abd Rabbih.

In addition to referencing the opinions of religious scholars, al-Qumindan also asserted that no fatwa from Al-Azhar University or other Islamic institutions has prohibited music in the present era. Furthermore, he highlighted that numerous figures from Al-Azhar had attended official events where musical instruments were played. Despite his reliance on religious arguments and hadiths, al-Qumindan ultimately asserted that there is no necessity for religious sources in this matter. He argued that reliance on jurisprudence and hadiths is unwarranted if they contradict reason.

The booklet Fasl Al-Khitab fi Ibaha Al-Oud wal-Rabab was met with considerable acclaim and attracted considerable attention from Islamic scholars in Aden. Despite al-Qumindan's explicit criticism of northern Yemeni religious scholars, the initial response originated from Aden, where a booklet was published under the name "Sheikh Al-Hindi," the identity of whom remains unknown. This refutation, presented in the booklet, addressed and disputed the arguments put forth by al-Qumindan in Fasl Al-Khitab. The scholars of the Imamate in the north did not offer a response.

Additionally, the booklet elicited poetic responses, particularly to the verses that al-Qumindan had included within it. One such poetic response was provided by al-Qumindan's contemporary, Abdul Majid Al-Asnaj, who composed verses that imitated the meter and rhyme of al-Qumindan's renowned poem Hali wa Inab Razqi (My State and My Vineyard). In these verses, Al-Asnaj advocated for the practice of virtuous conduct and abstinence from alcohol, suggesting a correlation between musical pursuits and moral decline. The poem "Hali wa Inab Razqi" had previously generated considerable interest and discussion due to its widespread popularity. Some religious scholars, including Mohammed Salem Al-Bayhani, interpreted the poem as an open invitation to consume wine. Al-Bayhani initiated a vigorous campaign against the poem, publishing multiple articles in Fatat Al-Jazirah, in which he critiqued al-Qumindan's work. He signed each article with "Al-Bayhani, a graduate of Al-Azhar University," indicating his academic credentials. In response, al-Qumindan published his articles, wherein he clarified that his poems did not contain the elements that Al-Bayhani had attributed to them. He also employed a humorous signature, writing "Ahmed Fadl al-Qumindan, a graduate of Masawa Mosque" (a small mosque in Al-Hawta). al-Qumindan addressed this controversy in his booklet Fasl Al-Khitab. The poem by Sheikh Abdul Majid Al-Asnaj, composed in the same meter and rhyme as Hali wa Inab Razqi and titled Man Lil-Bab Dha Al-Mughlaq (Who Will Open This Closed Door?), was set to music and recorded by the artist Awad Abdullah Al-Muslimi in 1950, seven years after al-Qumindan's death.

One of the primary factors contributing to al-Qumindan's profound religious erudition, as evidenced in his treatise Fasl Al-Khitab fi Ibaha Al-Oud wal-Rabab, was his intimate association with Sheikh Ahmed Mohammed Al-Abadi. Al-Abadi was a distinguished scholar in Al-Hawta, renowned for issuing fatwas based on the Quran and the Sunnah. He adhered to the principles of Ahl al-Sunnah wal-Jama'ah, was influenced by the ideas of Ibn Taymiyyah, and drew from the rulings of the four major Islamic schools of thought, with a particular inclination towards the Hanbali school of Imam Ahmed ibn Hanbal. Al-Abadi resided in Al-Hawta, al-Qumindan's hometown, where he provided support to the poet in his efforts to combat ignorance and the superstitions of charlatans. Additionally, he served as the head of Al-Mahsania School (subsequently renamed Al-Thawra Primary School) prior to relocating to Sheikh Othman, where he assumed the roles of president of the "Reform Club" and Imam of Al-Haj Zakariya Mosque. al-Qumindan often visited him at his residence in Sheikh Othman, where he explored a vast array of texts from Al-Abadi's extensive library. Their relationship encompassed not only intellectual discourse but also poetic expression. al-Qumindan engaged in a poetic exchange with Al-Abadi following the latter's gift of the book Talbis Iblis (The Devil's Deception) by Ibn Al-Jawzi.

=== Other compositions ===
In addition to the aforementioned works, al-Qumindan also produced several shorter literary essays and articles. One of his most noteworthy works is entitled "Al-Aqaid Al-Fasida" "Corrupt Beliefs", which is also known by the alternative title "To Whom Does Victory Belong Today?" The title of the essay is "To the Wheat Stalks or the Drums of the Fanatics?" and is also known as "To Whom Does Victory Belong Today?" "To the Virgin's Wheat Stalks or the Drums of the Fanatics?" In this article, al-Qumindan addresses a social phenomenon that was prevalent during that period: the increasing participation of women in popular female gatherings during holidays and religious celebrations, despite the concomitant neglect of their work in the fields. He encourages women to engage in the construction of society in conjunction with men, underscoring the significance of ensuring that women are accorded the same rights and obligations as men. Additionally, he advocates for women to liberate themselves from the veil, emerge from their isolation, and engage in labor, particularly in agriculture, which was the primary occupation in Lahij at the time.

This article was published in the introduction of his poetry collection, Al-Masdar Al-Mufid fi Ghina Lahij Al-Jadid. In this text, the author presents a dualistic view of women, positing two distinct states: the first, characterized by unveilings, self-reliance, and engagement in productive activities that benefit society; and the second, defined by veiling, a state of idleness, and dependence on others. He then proceeds to examine the consequences of each state, ultimately concluding, through a synthesis of argument and evidence, that the active, unveiled woman is more likely to prevail over the idle, veiled one. He characterizes the unveiled woman as a fighter against hunger and a hero in the battle of life, stating, "Nature has removed your veil out of necessity and need." al-Qumindan did not adhere to the view that the veil was a mandatory requirement of Islamic law. Instead, he posited that its imposition was a consequence of Muhammad's wives being the first to wear it. He used this subject as a vehicle for critiquing what he designated as corrupt religious beliefs, disseminated by preachers and sheikhs in mosques, potentially alluding to some religious scholars' exhortations to visit the shrines of saints and offering sacrifices to them.

al-Qumindan also wrote a short literary piece entitled "Al-Khazain Al-Mutlimsa" ("The Sealed Treasures"), which was first published in 1938 in the first edition of his poetry collection Al-Masdar Al-Mufid fi Ghina Lahij Al-Jadid, which was published in the same year under the title Al-Aghani Al-Lahjiya ("Lahij Songs"). In this article, he calls for abandoning superstitious beliefs, fighting ignorance, and relying on reason and logic. al-Qumindan's other positions similarly defend and glorify reason and advocate intellectual awakening and cultural renewal in Yemeni and Arab society, leading some to describe him as an enlightened thinker or an extension of the Arab Renaissance that took place in Egypt and Syria in the late 19th and early 20th centuries. In particular, al-Qumindan criticizes religious scholars who urge people to avoid magic and sorcery, believing that this stance only reinforces belief in the claims of charlatans, thereby increasing public interest in them.

Another of his articles, entitled "Wada' Bayt Ala Akbar" ("Farewell to the House on Akbar Street"), reflects on the time he spent in a house he rented from an Indian in Aden, where he stayed after the Ottoman forces entered Al-Hawta, Lahij, and the Al-Abdali family fled to their British allies in Aden during World War I. After the Ottoman defeat and withdrawal from Lahij, the Al-Abdali family, including al-Qumindan, returned to their homeland. al-Qumindan wrote this article upon his return, bidding farewell to the house in which he had lived for four years, three months, and eight days.

The poet also wrote another article entitled "Amir Araby Yasef Al-Jazirah Al-Arabya", in which he condemned social injustice in the Arab world and longed for the day when Arabs would occupy a respectable place among other nations and enjoy basic human rights such as education and freedom. In addition, he wrote a short autobiographical article entitled "Tareekh Hayati" ("The History of My Life"), which provides an overview of his life. In this piece, he begins by recounting his childhood and the education he received at his father's home and from local scholars and intellectuals in his hometown of Al-Hawta. He also describes his training in musical instruments. He then moves on to discuss his military leadership during the Ottoman invasion of Lahij and his family's subsequent move to Aden. The article details his correspondence with Ali Said Pasha, the Ottoman commander in Lahij. After discussing his return to Lahij and his retirement from the military, he devotes the rest of his brief autobiography to describing the musical ensemble he founded.

During the period when the poet was in charge of the Al-Husseini Garden, supervising farmers and conducting experiments to control agricultural pests and test the effectiveness of liquid pesticides, he gained practical experience in agriculture. He also studied various books and magazines related to the field. He summarized his agricultural knowledge in a manuscript entitled Al-Taqweem Al-Zira'i, which detailed the appropriate seasons for planting each type of crop in the poet's region, along with guidelines for irrigation, pruning, pest control, and other important agricultural practices for local farmers. The book was never published or made available to the public; it existed only in handwritten form on several sheets and was circulated among local farmers. Unfortunately, the manuscript was lost forever. The original manuscript was among the poet's possessions in his home. When his health deteriorated, he was moved to his family's palace, and during the move, the manuscript was lost along with other belongings.

In the issue of Fatat Al-Jazirah published in Aden on Sunday, August 2, 1942, al-Qamdan wrote an article titled "On 'Kashf Al-Niqab'." In this article, he attacks the scholar from Aden, Muḥammad ibn Salim Bayḥani, who had previously published an article accusing the poet of promoting drunkenness, immodesty, and moral decay through his poems and writings. Al-Qamdan refutes these allegations, asserting that al-Bayhani has falsely accused him to tarnish his reputation and present himself as a defender of religion in their previous debates, which included discussions on women's veiling and hijab. In his article, the poet responds in kind, attempting to discredit al-Bayhani and highlight his lack of genuine expertise in Islamic jurisprudence, portraying him as an intruder in the field. Subsequently, al-Qamdan seeks to enhance his own image by mentioning his social achievements.

== Posthumous ==
In the last years of his life, the popularity of Ahmed Fadl al-Qamadan's poetry declined considerably. He composed a poem entitled "Leeh Tenkrony Men Al-Dahqa Wna Seer", which was not included in his only published collection. Several writers, literary figures, and poets began to highlight Al-Qamadan's poetic and prose works. Among those who contributed to this revival was the Yemeni writer Umar al-Jaawi. In November 1971, al-Jaawi published an article entitled "Al-Qamadan: Al-Sha'er Al-A'ashiq" (Al-Qamadan: The Loving Poet and Artist) in the first issue of the magazine "Al-Fonoon" and also in "Al-Hekma", the official publication of the Yemeni Union of Writers and Poets, of which he was the editor. After becoming director general of Aden Radio and Television, al-Jaawi advocated the production of a radio drama documenting al-Qamadan's life and art. This effort resulted in a dramatic radio series that was broadcast on Aden Central Radio from October 20 to November 19, 1971, and rebroadcast in May 1972. The series, entitled " Halaqat Al-Qamadan Al-Rmadanya" (The Ramadan Episodes of Al-Qamadan) and also known by the poet's full name, "Ahmed Fadl al-Qamadan," consisted of thirty episodes produced by a theater troupe from al-Qamadan's hometown of Lahij. The work was directed by Muhammad Mahmoud al-Salami and included contributions by writer Abdullah hadi subait, who also provided the introduction to the series.

In addition to al-Jaawi's efforts, there were several references to al-Qamadan's poetry by local literary figures and poets during this period. At the first conference on literature and folklore in 1974, a comprehensive study by several Lahej poets and writers included excerpts from al-Qamadan's life and works. This was followed by other writings by critics and Yemeni scholars from within and outside Lahej.

The performance of many of al-Qamadan's poems by the Lahej artist Faisal Alawi contributed significantly to al-Qamadan's current fame. Alawi presented al-Qamadan's poems to a wide audience throughout Yemen and the Arabian Peninsula. Some believe that without Faisal Alawi's artistry, al-Qamadan might not have achieved his prominence and his creative contributions might have remained obscure. Alawi's performances successfully revived al-Qamadan's legacy, which had been forgotten for decades.

In 1980, the Ministry of Culture of the People's Democratic Republic of Yemen republished "Hadyet Al-Zaman Fe Akhbar Melook Lahij and Aden" ("The Gift of Time: News of the Kings of Lahej and Aden") in Beirut. Three years later, in 1983, al-Qamadan's collection of poems was republished in Aden by Dar al-Hamdani.

=== al-Qumindan Festival ===
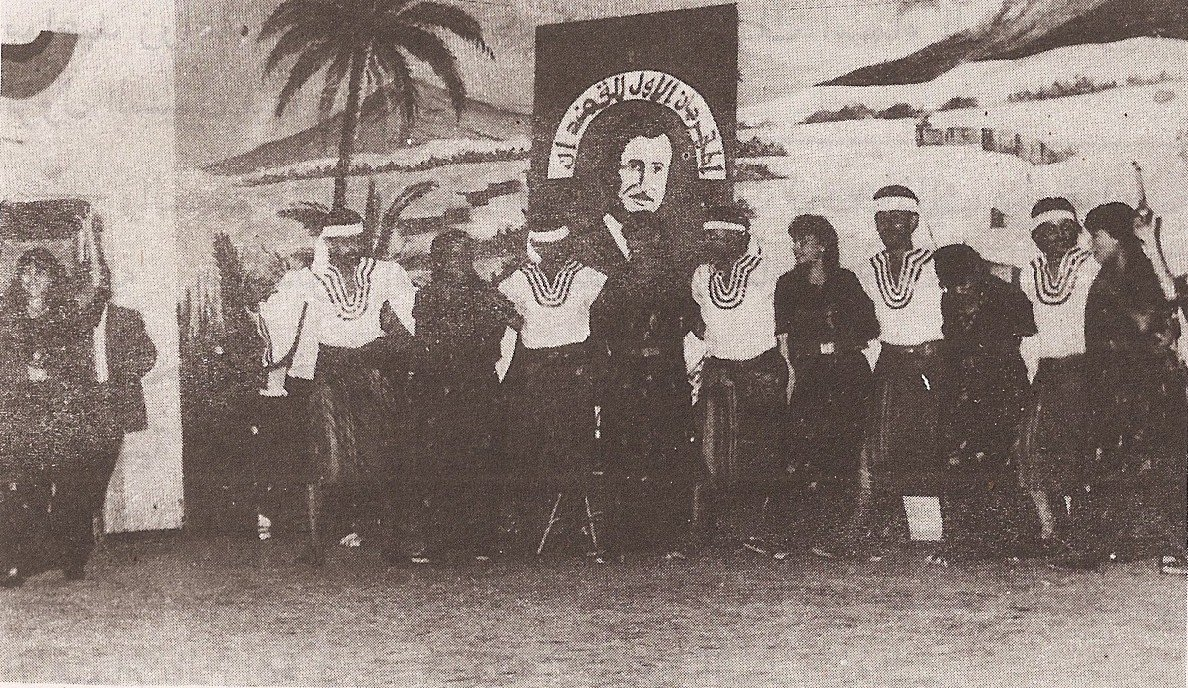
People celebrating the first Qumindan festival

About 45 years after the death of Ahmed Fadl al-Qamadan, a festival was held in his honor in the city of al-Hawta from November 27 to 30, 1988. Named "Al-Qamadan Festival", the event celebrated his legacy and poetry. During the festival, poets from Lahij recited verses praising al-Qamadan and recalling his contributions to the social, artistic, and agricultural fields. The event brought the public together to celebrate his memory through his songs and melodies. In closed sessions, researchers interested in al-Qamadan's legacy presented papers on his life and poetry, followed by discussions and critiques of their work. The festival was organized under the auspices of the Ministry of Culture and Information of the People's Democratic Republic of Yemen, in cooperation with the ruling Socialist Party, Yemeni Union of Writers and Poets, and the Local People's Council of Taiz Governorate.

=== Accusations of copyright infringement ===
On June 7, 2013, the 23rd episode of the second season of the popular Arabic talent show "Arab Idol" was broadcast on MBC channels and Nogoum FM radio. In that episode, Moroccan contestant Salma Rachid performed the song "Ya Monyti," which is based on a poem by the Yemeni poet Ahmed al-Qamadan that was not included in his published collections. During the episode, when Kuwaiti singer Ahlam was allowed to comment on the contestant's performance, she unintentionally attributed the song to Gulf music and claimed it as one of her compositions. This assertion prompted censure from select Yemeni media outlets, which perceived it as an effort to misappropriate the poet's intellectual property and ascribe it to another individual. Ahlam's comments included the following statements: "From the outset, I have regarded the Gulf song 'Ya Monyty' as one of my compositions, given that I frequently perform it." "It is a well-known Gulf song." The incident was highlighted by Yasser al-Shawafi, a writer and journalist for the Yemeni newspaper Al-Thawra, who published an article the day after the episode aired. The topic was subsequently covered by other Yemeni news websites, including the official site of the newspaper Aden al-Ghad.

Before this, the same poem by the poet Ahmed al-Qamadan had been the subject of a comparable incident on the television program The Voice during the tenth episode of its inaugural season, which was broadcast on MBC channels on November 16, 2012. In this episode, Saudi contestant Alaa Ahmed performed the song "Ya Monyti," although the screen attributed the song to Kuwaiti artist Abdul Mohsen Al-Muhanna. Nevertheless, a considerable number of individuals assert that the lyrics and melody of the song are the intellectual property of the poet al-Qamadan. This prompted some to view the incident as a violation of the poet's intellectual property rights. Calls were made by figures such as Foad al-Sharjabi, who manages the Yemeni House of Music, for legal action against "The Voice" and MBC Group for failing to verify the song's intellectual property rights before its broadcast.

Furthermore, allegations have been made against unidentified groups of Lahji artists and composers, claiming that they have altered, modified, and occasionally distorted the melodies of Ahmed al-Qamadan's compositions. These artists frequently present their modified versions as a form of renewal, a practice that has encountered considerable opposition from some quarters. When Abu Bakr Salem Balfaqih performed the poem "Sadat 'Ayn al-Maha," he altered the word "al-Lahji" in the fourth line to "Khalli," a change that was interpreted by some as promoting separatism. This alteration was regarded by some as an infringement on the poet's original words.
