= Saqqaf =

Saqqaf is a surname of Arabic origin (Arabic: ٱلسَّقَّاف). It has the variants of Al Saggoff and Al Saqqaf. People with the surname include:

- Ahmad bin Abdullah Al Saqqaf (1882–1949), Yemeni writer
- Abdul-Hafez al-Saqqaf, Yemeni military officer
- Abdulaziz Al-Saqqaf (1951–1999), Yemeni economist, and journalist
- Omar Al Saqqaf (1923–1974), Saudi Arabian diplomat and politician

== See also ==
- Alsagoff family, Arab Singaporean family
