= Sultanate of Lahej =

1728–1967 sheikhdom in southwest Arabia

Coordinates: 13.1°N 45.4667°E

Sultanate of Lahej سلطنة لحج (Arabic)
- 1728–1967
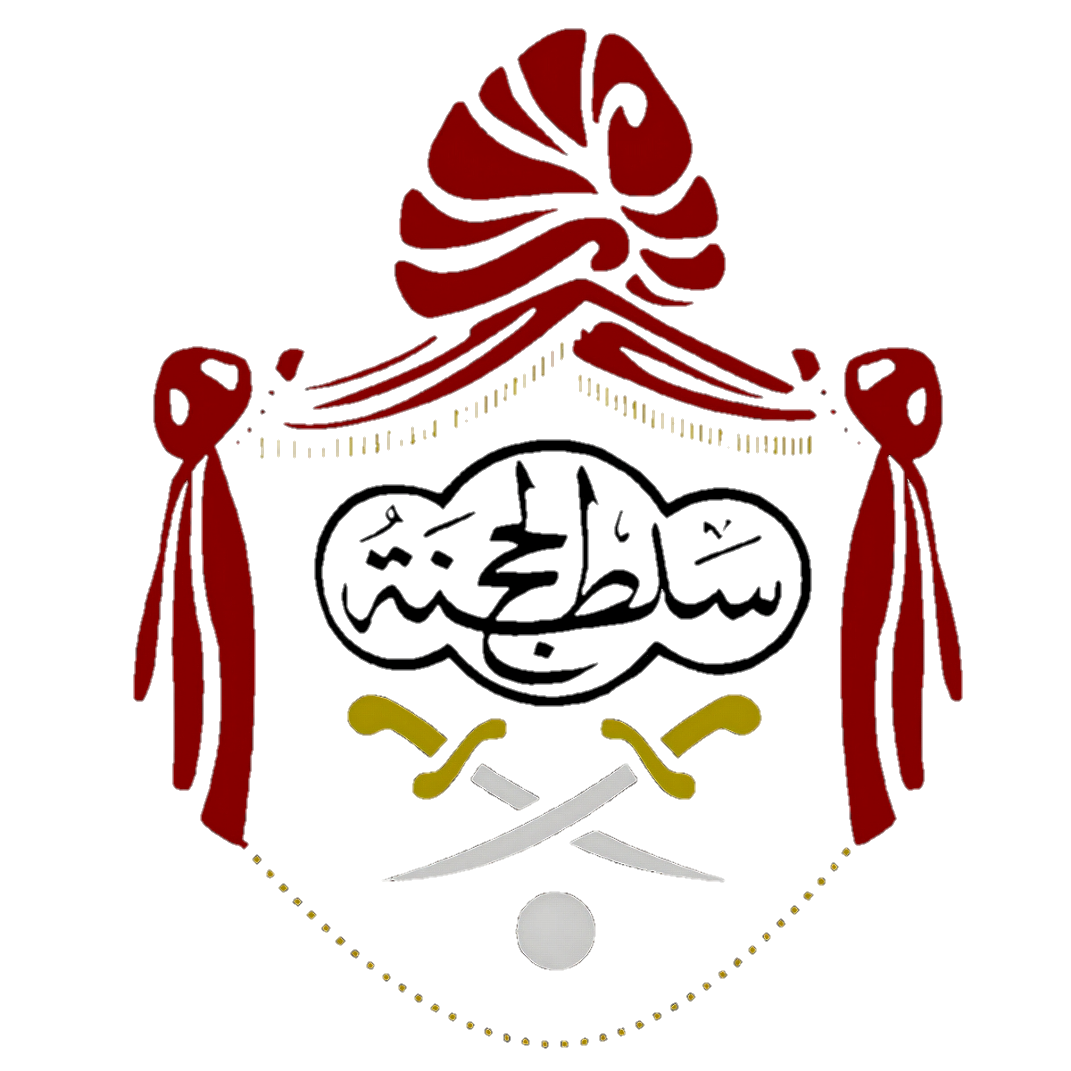
- Flag Emblem

- Map of the Sultanate of Lahej

- Map of the Sultanate of Lahej in its region
- Status: Qasimid State (1728–1740); Independent (1740–1872); Aden Protectorate (1872–1963); Federation of South Arabia (1963–1967)
- Capital: Lahij
- Religion: Sunni Islam
- Government: Sultanate
- Sultan
- History
  - Beginning of self-rule: 1728
  - Independence from the Zaidi Imamate: 1740
  - British invasion: 1839
  - Start of the British protectorate: 1872
  - Deposed by the NLF: 1967

Population
  - 1960 estimate: 50,000
Preceded by	Succeeded by
Qasimid State	Aden Settlement; South Yemen
- Today part of: Yemen

Lahej (Arabic: لحج Laḥij), the Sultanate of Lahej (Arabic: سلطنة لحج Salṭanat Laḥij), or, sometimes, the Abdali Sultanate (Arabic: سلطنة العبدلي Salṭanat al-'Abdalī), was a Sheikdom based in Lahij in Southern Arabia. The Sultanate became self-ruling in 1728 and gained independence in 1740. In 1839, the Sultanate became part of the Aden Protectorate of the British Empire, though nominally the 'Abdali Sultan retained his status. The Aden Protectorate was briefly ruled again by the Ottomans during World War I, but regained by the British after the Ottoman defeat in World War I and absorbed into Federation of South Arabia in 1963. The 'Abdali dynasty was officially abolished in 1967, with the proclamation of South Yemen.

== History ==
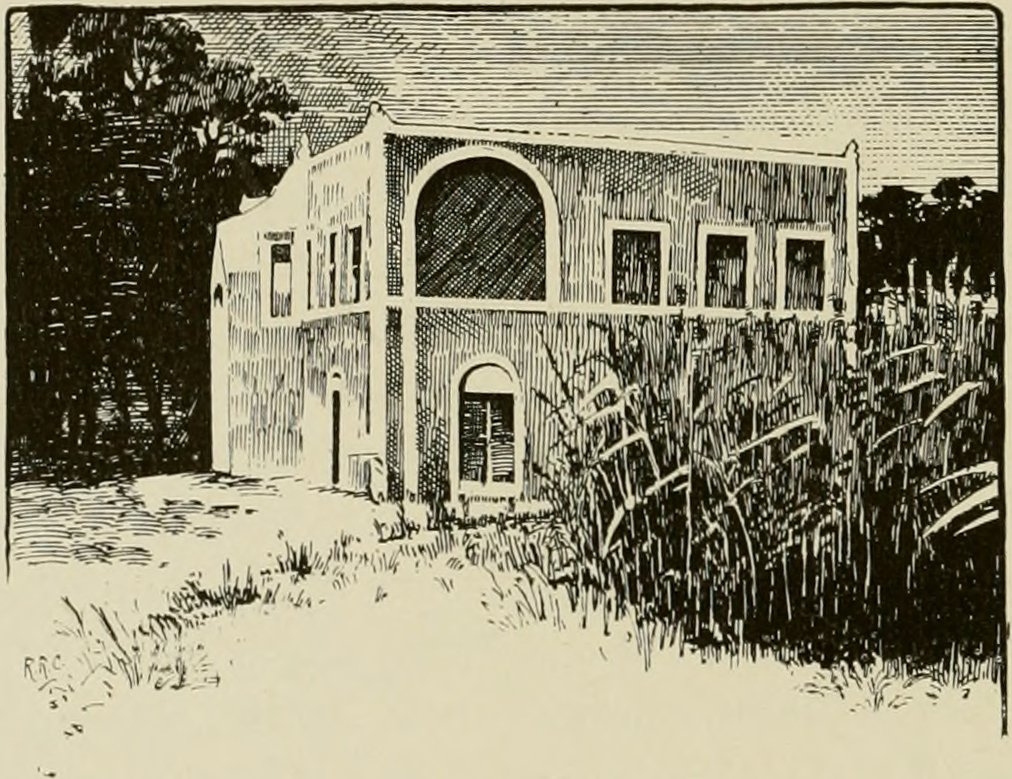
Guest House of the Sultan of Lahej, from an 1898 photograph by Henry Ogg Forbes.

=== Establishment ===
Lahej was a sultanate of the 'Abdali dynasty. In 1740 the 'Abdali sultan became independent. It became independent thanks to the fracturing of the Zaidi State in north Yemen. The Sultanate of Lahej became an independent entity, from 1728 to 1839.

=== The arrival of the British ===
The first political intercourse between Lahej and the British took place in 1799, when a naval force was sent from Great Britain, with a detachment of troops from India, to occupy the island of Perim and prevent all communication of the French in Egypt with the Indian Ocean, by way of the Red Sea. The island of Perim was found unsuitable for troops, and the Sultan of Lahej, Ahmed bin Abdul Karim, received the detachment for some time at Aden. He proposed to enter into an alliance and to grant Aden as a permanent station, but the offer was declined. A Treaty was, however, concluded with the Sultan in 1802 by Admiral Sir Home Popham, who was instructed to enter into political and commercial alliances with the Chiefs of the Arabian coast of the Red Sea.

=== The loss of Aden ===
From that time there was little or no intercourse with Aden until 1837, when attention was drawn to the plunder and maltreatment of the crews of British vessels wrecked on the Aden coast. The most notable case was that of the Deria Dowlut, the crew of which were stripped and barbarously treated. Captain Haines, who was then employed in the survey of the Arabian coast, was instructed to demand satisfaction. He was at the same time to endeavour to purchase Aden as a coaling depot for the steamers plying between India and the Red Sea. Sultan Muhsin, who had succeeded his uncle, Sultan Ahmed, in 1827, at first denied all participation in the plunder; but, finding the British Commissioner firm in his demands, he eventually consented to give up part of the property and pay compensation for the rest. A draft treaty for the cession of Aden was laid before the Sultan, to which he gave his verbal consent and promised formally to agree after consulting his Chiefs. In this draft the amount of compensation to he paid for Aden was left undetermined, but it was afterwards arranged that an annual payment of 8,700 crowns should he made.

On 22 January 1838, Sultan Muhsin sent a letter under his seal, engaging to make over Aden, after two months, but stipulating that his authority over his people in Aden should be maintained after the cession. To the continuance of the Sultan's jurisdiction the British Agent objected. The Sultan replied that he was willing to abide by the terms first offered: but, if these were not accepted, his letter of 22 January should be returned to him. Negotiations were at this stage when a plot was laid by Ahmed, the Sultan's son; to seize the Agent and rob him of his papers, and delivery of the property stolen from the wreck of the Deria Dowhit was also refused. Preparations were therefore made to coerce the Sultan.

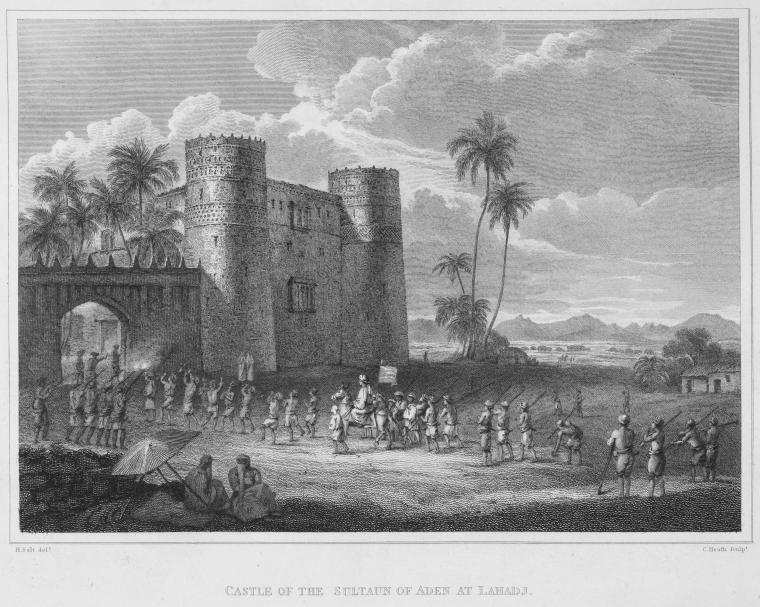
Castle of the Sultaun of Aden at Lahadj, c. 1814, by Henry Salt

On 19 January 1839, Aden was bombarded and taken, and the Sultan and his family fled to Lahej. On 2 February, peace was made in the Sultan's name by his son-in law, and on 18 June the Sultan himself signed a Bond, engaging to maintain peace and friendship with the British Government, who agreed to pay him and his heirs 6,500 dollars a year, and likewise to pay the stipends which the Sultan was bound to give to the Fadhili, Haushabi and Amiri tribes.

Peace, however, was soon after broken by an unsuccessful attempt made by Sultan Muhsin in November 1839 to retake Aden, and the payments were therefore stopped. A second attack was made in May 1840 was also unsuccessful, and the repulse of a third attack in July of the same year completely disheartened the Arabs for a time. In 1843 Sultan Muhsin came to Aden and sued for peace. An Engagement was made on 11 February 1843. which the British government considered in the light of an agreement to be observed between the Political Agent and the Sultan, but not of a treaty to be formally ratified. In February 1844, a monthly stipend of 541 dollars was restored to the Sultan with a year's arrears and, before this was paid, another Agreement was taken from him, binding him faithfully to observe his engagements,

=== After Sultan Muhsin ===
Sultan Muhsin died on 30 November 1847, leaving nine sons. He was succeeded by his eldest son, Ahmed, who died on 18 January 1849, when his next brother, Ali bin Muhsin, succeeded. Shortly after his accession to power, a treaty of peace, friendship and commerce, which was under negotiation with his predecessor, was concluded with him. Among its other provisions, this treaty stipulated for the restoration of the monthly stipend which had been stopped in consequence of the share taken by the late Chief, Sultan Muhsin, in an attack on Aden in August 1846.

Relations with the new Chief remained on a fairly satisfactory feeding until 1857. when, taking umbrage at some fancied wrongs, he entered upon a course of open hostility to the British Government. He was completely defeated by an expedition which marched against him in 1858, and the peace which followed remained unbroken until his death in 1863.

His son, Fadhl l (Fazl) bin Ali, was elected by the tribes and elders to succeed him in the government, but no sooner had he assumed the management of affairs than intrigues were set on foot by other members of the family with a view to his displacement. Ultimately an arrangement was effected, through the mediation of the Resident at Aden and with the consent of the young Chief, by which he was succeeded in the government of the country by his uncle. Fadhl bin Muhsin, fourth son of Sultan Muhsin. For the assistance rendered by Sultan Fadhl bin Muhsin in supplying forage and means of transport for the troops employed against the Fadhli tribe in 1865, he was presented with 5000 dollars.

In 1867 the Chief consented to the construction of an aqueduct for the supply of water from the Shaikh Othman wells to Aden, a distance of 6 miles (10 km).

In 1873, in consequence of repeated applications by the Sultan of Lahej, for the protection of the British Government against the Turks, who had demanded his submission, had occupied a part of Zaida and Shakaa, and had sent troops to support his rebellious brother Abdulla, a force of British and Indian Infantry with three guns marched to Al Hauta, the capital of Lahej, to protect the Sultan. After some negotiations the Turkish troops evacuated Lahej and Shakaa, and the Sultan's two brothers and nephew surrendered unconditionally and were conveyed as State prisoners to Aden, while their forts were dismantled. They were subsequently released and retired to Mocha. Sultan Fadhl bin Muhsin died in July 1874, and was succeeded by his nephew, Fadhl bin Ali, who had resigned the Chiefship in his favour in 1863. The payment of the usual annual stipend of 6,492 dollars was continued to the latter, the amount being increased in 1882 to 19,692 dollars.

In 1877, the Sultan of Lahej was granted a permanent salute of 9 guns.

In July 1881, an agreement was concluded between the Abdali and the Haushabi, by which a portion of the Zaida lands taken from the latter tribe in 1873 was restored to them, and a cause of constant mutual irritation was thus effectually removed. In 1881, the Abdali entered into an Agreement by which the Subeihi were placed under their control, the stipends previously received by the latter being made payable to the Abdali.

On 7 February 1882, by a treaty with the Abdali Sultan, arrangements were made for the purchase, by the British Government, of some 35 square miles (90.6 square kilometres) of territory attached to Shaikh Othman, between the Hiswa and Imad; the salt-pits at Shaikh Othman and the aqueduct between that place and Aden at the same time became British property. Between May and July 1886, the Abdali Chief made repeated complaints of the hardships entailed by the Subeihi Agreement, from which he wished to withdraw entirely. In August he reported that one of his garrisons had been massacred, and that all the others were surrounded by the Subeihi, and craved assistance in rescuing them. The Resident despatched 50 sabres of the Aden troop (which had been raised in 1805 for police purposes) to support him, and also lent him rifles and ammunition. These proceedings resulted in the safe withdrawal of the garrisons; but from this date the Subeihi agreement became practically inoperative, and the various Subeihi tribes resumed their old position of independent relations with the Aden Residency.

At the close of 1886, the Abdali bought back from the Haushabi the lands referred to in the Zaida Agreement, and the Resident thereupon intimated to both Chiefs that articles 1 and 2 of that agreement were held to be cancelled, with the exception of the words permitting the Haushabi to erect a house at Al Anad.

In 1894, owing to the heavy taxes levied on qafilahs by the Haushabi Sultan Muhsin bin Ali, the Abdali entered Haushabi territory and its Sultan fled. He was repudiated by bis Shaikhs and, at their request, Sultan Fadhl bin Ali made suitable arrangements for administering their country and protecting the trade routes. The Haushabi Sultan eventually gave himself up at Lahej and on 6 August 1895 signed an Agreement by which his territory was restored to him under certain guarantees.

On 27 April 1898, Sultan Fadhl bin Ali died. He was succeeded by his cousin, Ahmed Fadhl, to whom the payment of the usual annual stipend was continued.

In April 1899, owing to continual robberies by the Subeihi, the Abdali were given permission to occupy Has al Arab, Turan and Am Rija in the Subeihi country, In November the Abdali raised a force against the Atifi section in consequence of an attack made by the latter on Dar al Kudeimi. The Atifi then submitted. In 1902, the Sultan again raised a force to suppress the Subeihi. After a few skirmishes he returned to Lahej.

In September 1906, the Rijai Shaikh signed an agreement formally acknowledging himself as the vassal of the Abdali.

In 1910, a convention was executed with the Sultan, by which he ceded to the government a piece of land on the left bank and eastward of Wadi As-Saghir for use as headworks of the water supply of Aden. The convention was ratified on 17 March 1911. It, however, became a dead letter, as the scheme has been abandoned.

In March 1914, Sultan Sir Ahmed Fadhl died. He was succeeded by his cousin, Ali bin Ahmed to whom the payment of the usual annual stipend was continued.

=== World War I ===
In July 1915, a Turkish force under General Said Pasha from Yemen attacked and captured Lahej which they retained until the end of the war. The Sultan, whose irregular troops were unable to offer successful resistance, abandoned his country to the enemy and retired with the British troops which had been hastily despatched to defend Lahej. The Sultan died at Aden from wounds received during the attack on Lahej.

His successor Sultan Abdul Karim was the son of a former Chief, Fadhl bin Ali. His election took place in Aden, where he was a refugee until the end of the war. He was formally installed in his capital on 14 December 1918, after the surrender of the Turkish garrison at Lahej to the British, and was granted a sum of £10,000 by the British government as a mark of their friendship and appreciation of his loyalty, and to enable him to re-establish the administration of his country. The stipend paid to his father was continued to him.

=== Reinstalled British protectorate and Federation of South Arabia ===
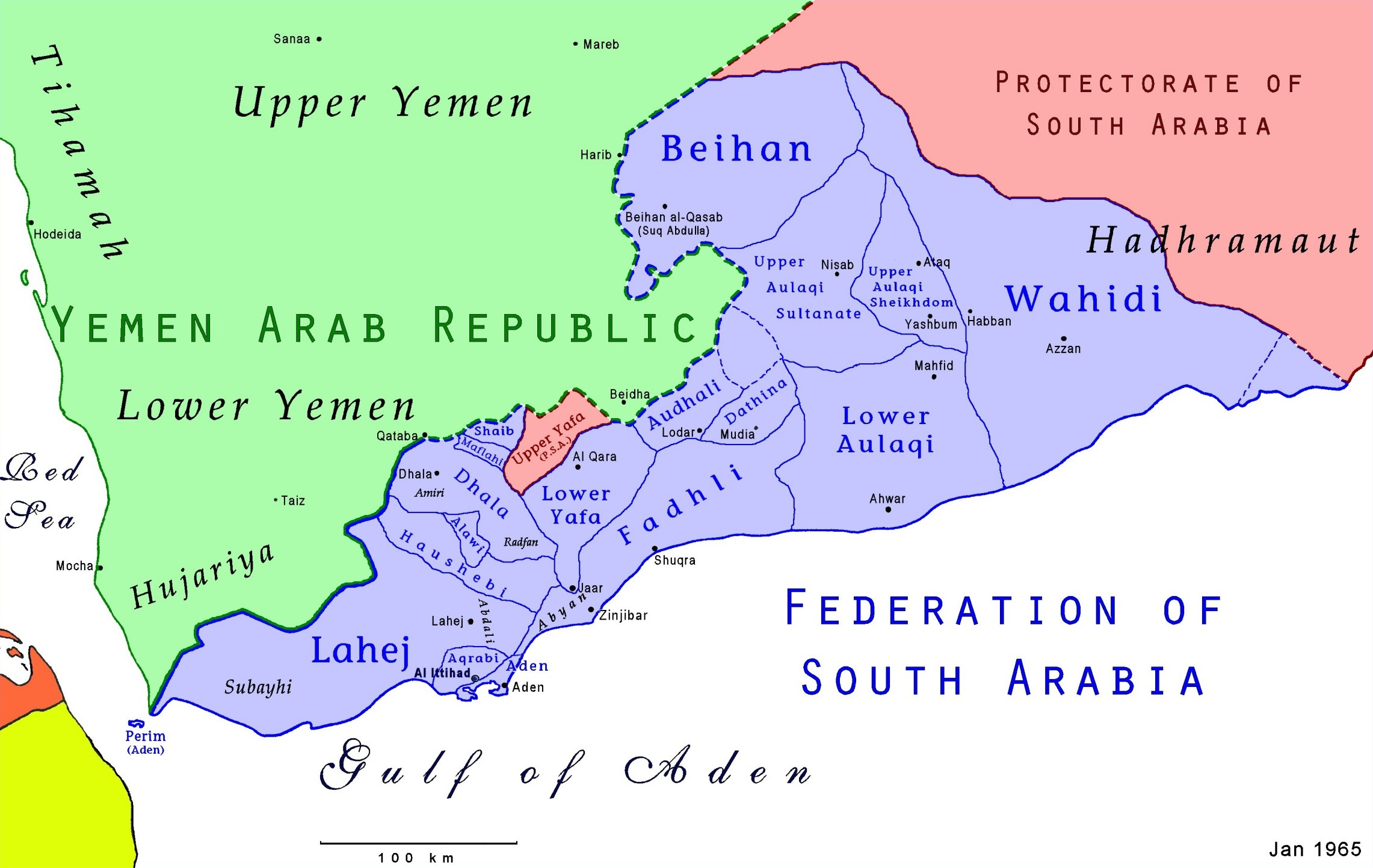
Map of Lahej in the Federation of South Arabia, 1965

Lahej typically enjoyed good relations with the British, despite the accidental killing of Sultan Fadhl ibn Ali al Abdali by British troops in 1918 who mistook him for an enemy Ottoman Turkish soldier.

In 1918, Sultan Abdul Karim was granted a personal salute of 11 guns.

In February 1919, the Subeihi were again placed under the control of the Abdali.

The ratification of this agreement, had been postponed by the British government until after the final settlement of the future political status of Arabia. The agreement, although only in partial operation during recent years had the effect of strengthening the influence of the Sultan of Lahej in the Subeihi area.

In January 1919, in consequence of incursions by the Imam into the Protectorate and the resulting danger to Lahej, a force of British troops was sent to garrison Nobat Dukeim. It was withdrawn in July 1922, but a small detachment of Indian troops was left at Habil. This was withdrawn in April 1928.

The Sultan visited India in 1922 and England in 1924 when he was received by His Majesty King George V, together with his son Fadlil. He visited India again in 1930.

The Resident convened the first Conference of ruling chiefs of the Protectorate in April 1929. The Conference was held at Lahej under the Presidency of the Abdali Sultan and was reconvened in December 1930.

In 1931, The gross revenue of the Adbali was estimated at Rs. 2,75,000 a year, and the population amounted to about 35,000 in.

In 1948, the Subayhi tribal area was absorbed into the sultanate.

By 1958, Britain was worried that the sultan at the time, Ali bin Abd al Karim al Abdali, an Arab nationalist, would refuse to join the British-sponsored Federation of Arab Emirates of the South, and had him deposed. Lahej ended up joining the Federation and later the Federation of South Arabia in 1963.

=== Aftermath ===
==== South Yemen ====
In 1967 the new Communist regime expelled the Abdali Sultan. The dynasty of the Sultanate of Lahej was abolished with the founding of the socialist state of People's Democratic Republic of Yemen (1967–1990).

==== Unified Yemen ====
The former territory of the Sultanate has been within the Republic of Yemen since the Yemeni unification in 1990.

== Rulers ==
=== Abdali Sultans ===
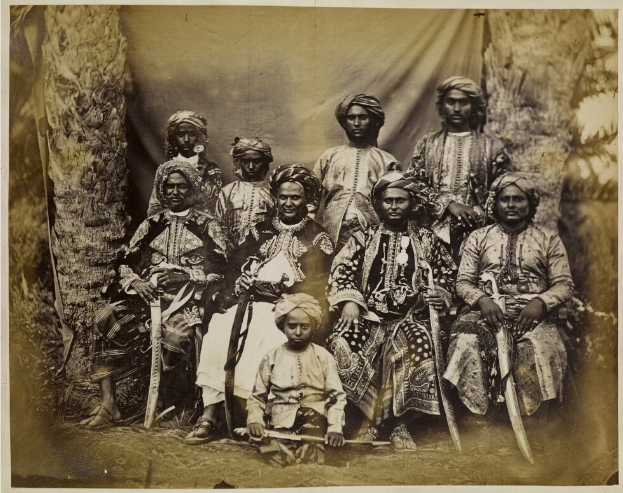
Family of the Sultan of Lahej (mid-1870s)

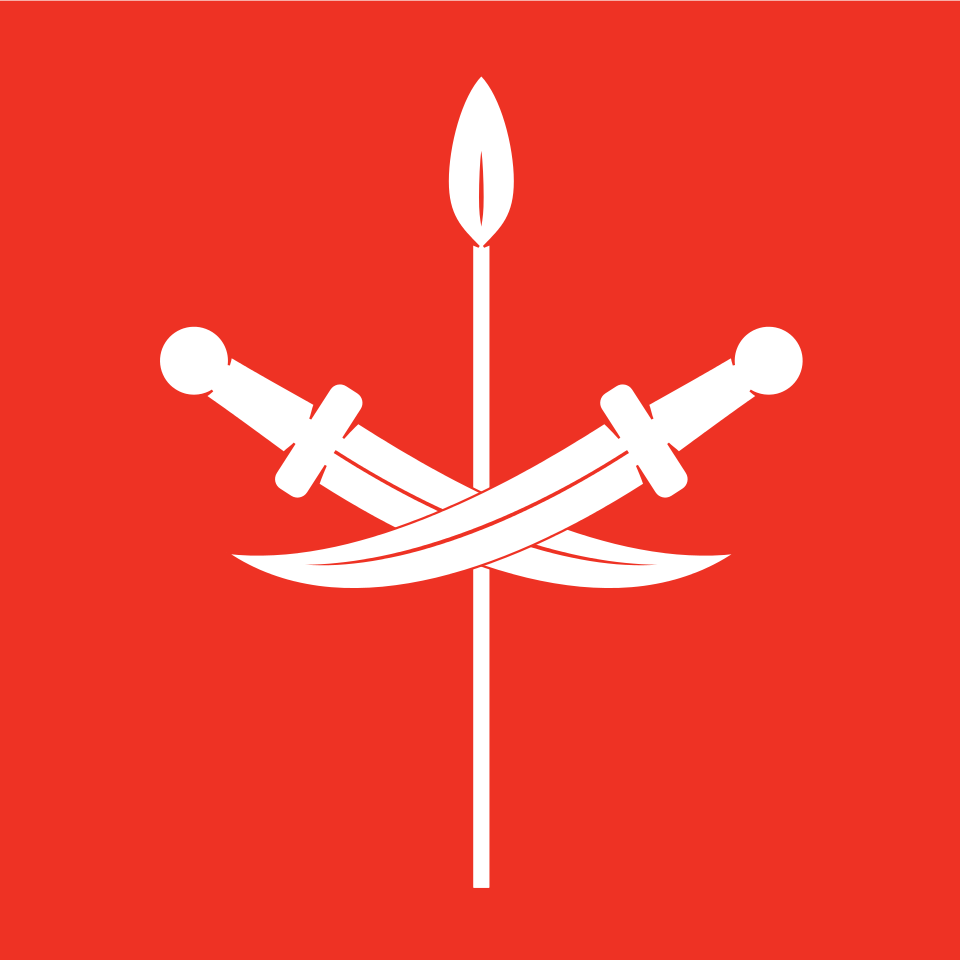
Sultan's standard

- 1728–1742: al-Fadl I ibn 'Ali al-Sallami al-'Abdali
- 1742–1753: 'Abd al-Karim I ibn al-Fadl al-'Abdali
- 1753–1775: 'Abd al-Hadi ibn 'Abd al-Karim al-'Abdali
- 1775–1791: al-Fadl II ibn 'Abd al-Karim al-'Abdali
- 1791–1827: Ahmad I ibn 'Abd al-Karim al-'Abdali
- 1827 – November 1839: Muhsin ibn al-Fadl al-'Abdali (1st time)
- November 1839 – December 1839: Ahmad II ibn Muhsin al-'Abdali (1st time)
- December 1839 – August 1846: Muhsin ibn al-Fadl al-'Abdali (2nd time)
- 11 August 1846 – September 1846: Sayyid Isma'il ibn al-Hasan al-Husayni (usurper)
- September 1846 – 30 November 1847: Muhsin ibn al-Fadl al-'Abdali (3rd time)
- December 1847 – 20 January 1849: Ahmad II ibn Muhsin al-'Abdali (2nd time)
- March 1849 – 7 April 1863: 'Ali I ibn Muhsin al-'Abdali
- April 1863 – 1863: al-Fadl III ibn 'Ali al-'Abdali (1st time)
- 1863 – 5 July 1874: al-Fadl IV ibn Muhsin al-'Abdali
- 5 July 1874 – 27 April 1898: al-Fadl III ibn 'Ali al-'Abdali (2nd time)
- 29 April 1898 – March 1914: Ahmad III ibn al-Fadl al-'Abdali (from 9 Nov 1901, Sir Ahmad III ibn al-Fadl al-'Abdali)
- March 1914 – 4 July 1915: 'Ali II ibn Ahmad al-'Abdali (from 8 Oct 1914, Sir 'Ali II ibn Ahmad al-'Abdali)
- 13 July 1915 – 18 June 1947: 'Abd al-Karim II ibn al-Fadl al-'Abdali (from 1 Jan 1918, Sir 'Abd al-Karim II ibn al-Fadl al-'Abdali)
- 18 June 1947 – 21 May 1952: al-Fadl V ibn 'Abd al-Karim al-'Abdali
- 4 June 1952 – 10 July 1958: 'Ali III ibn 'Abd al-Karim al-'Abdali (from 1 Jan 1955, Sir 'Ali III ibn 'Abd al-Karim al-'Abdali)
- 10 July 1958 – August 1967: al-Fadl VI ibn 'Ali al-'Abdali (acting with style Na'ib to 8 Dec 1958)

== Economy ==
=== British Empire ===
The Sultanate of Lahej and others surrounding the Port of Aden had economic influence by supporting the important trade economy of the British Empire from South Asia. Early 19th century industrial Britain, with its rapidly expanding economy, needed improved and reliable communication with British India and the East India Company operations.

The 1863 opening of the Suez Canal initiated further British trade protection strategies, securing the port of Aden and surroundings to serve the Red Sea shipping routes using its new canal. The Sultanate was part of an effort of the British Empire to protect the East India Route, the sea route between the Mediterranean and India, in and through the southern coasts of the Arabian Peninsula.

=== Resources ===
As of 1920, the Lahej region was producing salt, from salt mines owned by the Ottoman government, that passed through the Sultanate for shipping.

== See also ==
- Aden Protectorate
- Ahmed Fadl Al-Qomandan
- Colony of Aden (1937–63) — Crown colony.
- Fadhli Sultanate
- Federation of Arab Emirates of the South (1959–62)
- Federation of South Arabia (1962–67)
- Protectorate of South Arabia (1962–67)
