= Ahmad bin Abdullah Al Saqqaf =

Yemeni writer and poet

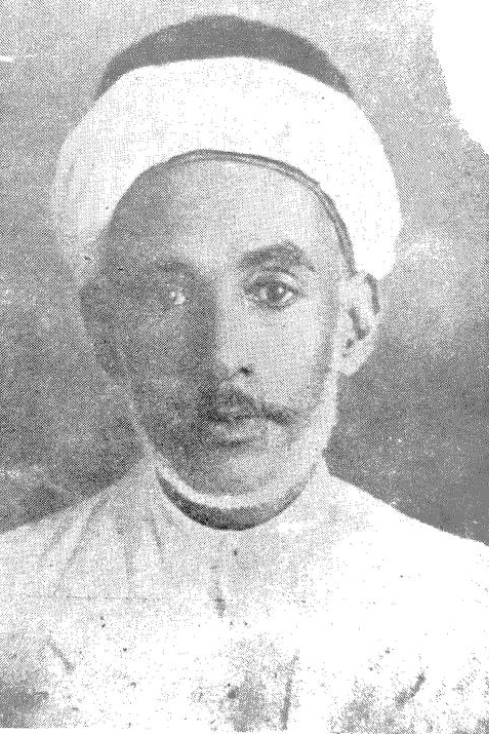

Ahmad bin Abdullah bin Mohsin bin Saqqaf al-Saqqaf (1882–1949) was a Yemeni novelist, journalist, and poet. His 1927 novel Fatat Qarout (Ar: فتاة قاروت) is regarded by some as the first novel ever written by a Yemeni writer.

== Early life ==
Al-Saqqaf was born in 1882 in Al-Shihr, a town in the Hadhramaut region, to a family known for their learning and knowledge of Islamic jurisprudence. At age four he moved to Seiyun.

== Career ==
In 1907 he immigrated to India, and studied in Hyderabad. The following year, he moved to Indonesia, and settled in the city of Surabaya. He played a major role in journalism in the Yemeni diaspora, submitting articles to the Surabaya-based newspaper Al-Islah and founding a monthly newspaper in 1927 called The Higher Association (Ar: "الرابطة العلوية"). The newspaper focused on issues concerning the Hadhrami community in Indonesia. With other Yemeni expatriates, al-Saqqaf founded associations and schools in several Indonesian cities.

Al-Saqqaf is best known for his 1927 novel Fatat Qarout (The Girl from Garut), which criticizes some of the practices of Hadhrami immigrants in the East Indies, such as their integration into local Javan society. According to Dr. Massoud Amshush, this was the first novel ever written by a Yemeni writer. However, others have argued that Muhammad Ali Luqman's Saeed should be considered the first Yemeni novel, as it was published in Aden - unlike al-Saqqaf's work, which was written and published in Indonesia.

His other works include Patience and Persistence (Ar: الصبر والثبات), The System of Islamic Etiquette for Girls (Ar: منظومات الأداب الإسلامية للبنات), and several collections of poetry. He is said to have written a second novel in addition to Fatat Qarout, but there is little information about this.

== Death ==
Al-Saqqaf died in 1949, while en route to Yemen aboard a ship from Indonesia.
