= Muhammad Ali Luqman =

Yemeni lawyer, writer, and journalist

Mohammed Ali Luqman
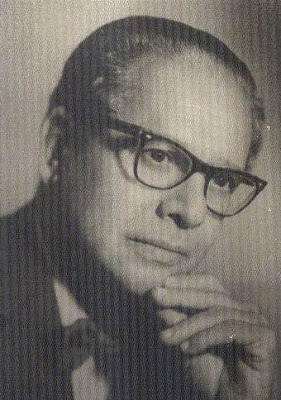
- Mohammed Ali Luqman
- Born: 6 November 1898; Aden, Aden Province
- Died: 24 March 1966 (aged 67); Mecca, Saudi Arabia
- Occupations: Lawyer; Writer; Journalist

Muhammad Ali Luqman (6 November 1898 – 24 March 1966) was a Yemeni lawyer, writer, and journalist. He was born in Aden, which was formerly under British Indian rule. After completing his education, he worked in school administration in Aden. However, he was dismissed from his position after publishing a letter, entitled "Is This a Scrap of Paper?" (Arabic: هل هذه قصاصة ورقية؟), which criticized the educational system.

Like many Arabs in Aden, Luqman was an Indian Nationalist, having traveled across India with Ambedkar, and becoming Gandhi's Arabic and Gujrati Translator during his visit to Aden. However, by 1931 he had begun to change his mind due to anti-Arab sentiments. From 1930 to 1934, he worked as an agent for Al-Bas Company in Somalia, and the studied law in Bombay, obtaining a degree in 1938.

In 1939, Luqman's novel, Saeed was published. Some claim this to be the first Yemeni novel, although others have argued for Ahmad bin Abdullah Al Saqqaf's 1927 novel The Girl from Garut.

Luqman established Faṫāṫ Al-Jazīrah (Arabic: فَـتَـاة الْـجَـزِيْـرَة), the first independent newspaper in Yemen, in 1940. He also founded a weekly English-language newspaper, the Aden Chronicle, in 1953.

He was closely linked with the Free Yemeni Movement, and was one of the architects of the failed 1948 coup against Yemeni ruler Imam Yahya. On September 18, 1962, Luqman traveled to New York City at his own expense, following the United Kingdom's attempt to forcibly merge the colony of Aden into the Federation of South Arabia. Luqman succeeded in winning support from member states at the United Nations to prevent this from occurring.

He died in 1966, on his way to perform the Hajj, and was buried in Mecca. The two newspapers he established were maintained by his son, journalist Farouk Luqman, until South Yemen gained independence the next year, in 1967.

== Works ==
- Is This a Scrap of Paper? (1923) (هل هذه قصاصة ورقية؟), essay
- How Have the People of the West Succeeded in Making Progress? (1932) (بماذا تقدم الغربيون؟)
- The Love Commander (1933) (القائد المغرم), play
- Journey through The Land of Somalia (1934) (جولة في بلاد الصومال)
- Saeed (1939) (سعيد), novel
- Kamala Devi, novel
- Rajab’s Letter (رسالة رجب)
- The British People: their History and Morals (1940) (الشعب البريطاني: تاريخه وأخلاقه)
- In the Land of Al-Zahir (1945) (في أرض الظاهر)
- Victory of Thought in the French Revolution (1947) ( إنتصار الفكر في الثورة الفرنسية)
- The History of the Lahj Constitution (1952) (قصة الدستور اللحجي)
- Aden Demands Autonomy (1954) (عدن تطلب الحكم الذاتي)
- The History of the Yemeni Revolution (1962) (قصة الثورة اليمنية)
