= Tuban district =

Coordinates: 13°00′N 44°50′E

Tuban District مديرية تبن
- District
- Interactive map of Tuban District
- Country: Yemen
- Governorate: Lahij Governorate

Population (2003)
  - Total: 83,444
- Time zone: UTC+3 (Yemen Standard Time)

Tuban District is a district of the Lahij Governorate, Yemen. As of 2003, the district had a population of 83,444 people.
