= Arab wedding =

Arab cultural ceremony of matrimony

Arab weddings (Arabic: زفاف, فرح, or عرس) are ceremonies of matrimony that contain Arab influences or Arab culture.

Traditional Arab weddings are intended to be very similar to modern-day Bedouin and rural weddings. What is sometimes called a "Bedouin" wedding is a traditional Arab Islamic wedding without any foreign influence. Ceremonies may, in some cases, be unique from one region to another, even within the same country.

The marriage process usually starts with meetings between the couple's families and ends with the consummation of the betrothed (ليلات آل-دخل leilat al-dokhla).

For a wedding to be considered Islamic, the bride and groom must both consent, and the groom must be welcomed into the bride's house, but only in the presence of her parents, to maintain propriety on both sides.

The most common events of a Muslim marriage are variations of the following: marriage proposal, engagement, henna, nikah, registration, reception, walima, honeymoon.

The only Islamic requirement is to hold the nikah and announcement of it. Other events are cultural additions. Civil registration is usually a legal requirement.

== Arranged marriages ==
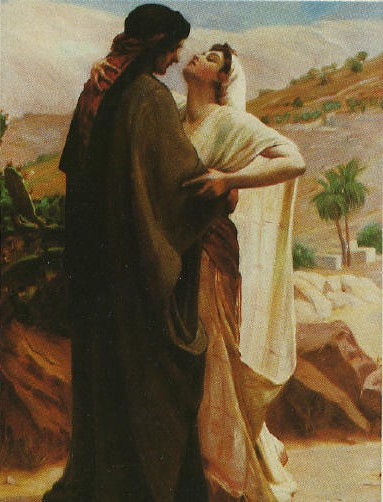
Arab couple (Passionate Encounter)

Arranged marriage prevails in the Arab world, as it does in the Indian subcontinent, and in most of East Asia. The traditions of these societies forbid premarital sex as well as socializing between men and women before marriage. In these societies, when a young woman is considered old enough to be married, her family will look around to identify several potential families of similar social background where she would find happiness in marriage and where she would become an integral part of her new family without much of an adjustment problem. Likewise, when a young man is considered old enough to be married, his family will look around to identify several potential brides from good families with good values.

While this is the case in most other societies named above, there are further factors that add to the comfort and assurance of the couple in the Arab nations of West Asia and North Africa: the tradition of consanguineous marriage. In these countries, at least one-sixth of all marriages are consanguineous. In Saudi Arabia, the majority (65%+) of all marriages are endogamous and consanguineous arranged marriages. More than 40% of all marriages are endogamous and consanguineous in Iraq, Jordan, Syria, Yemen, Kuwait, UAE, Oman, Sudan, Libya, Mauritania and over 1 in 5 marriages in Egypt and Algeria. Arranged marriages include endogamous and non-consanguineous marriages and therefore exceed the above observed rates of endogamous and consanguineous marriages. Arab Christians, such as Coptic Christians in Egypt, have similar patterns of marriage. Marriage was a central feature of traditional Aboriginal societies. Freedom of marriage was restricted to ensure children were produced according to the correct family groups and affiliations and to avoid marriages with certain close relatives or marriages with anyone outside the group. Opinions vary on whether the phenomenon should be seen as exclusively based on Islamic practices, as a 1992 study among Arabs in Jordan did not show significant differences between Christian Arabs and Muslim Arabs when comparing the occurrence of consanguinity.

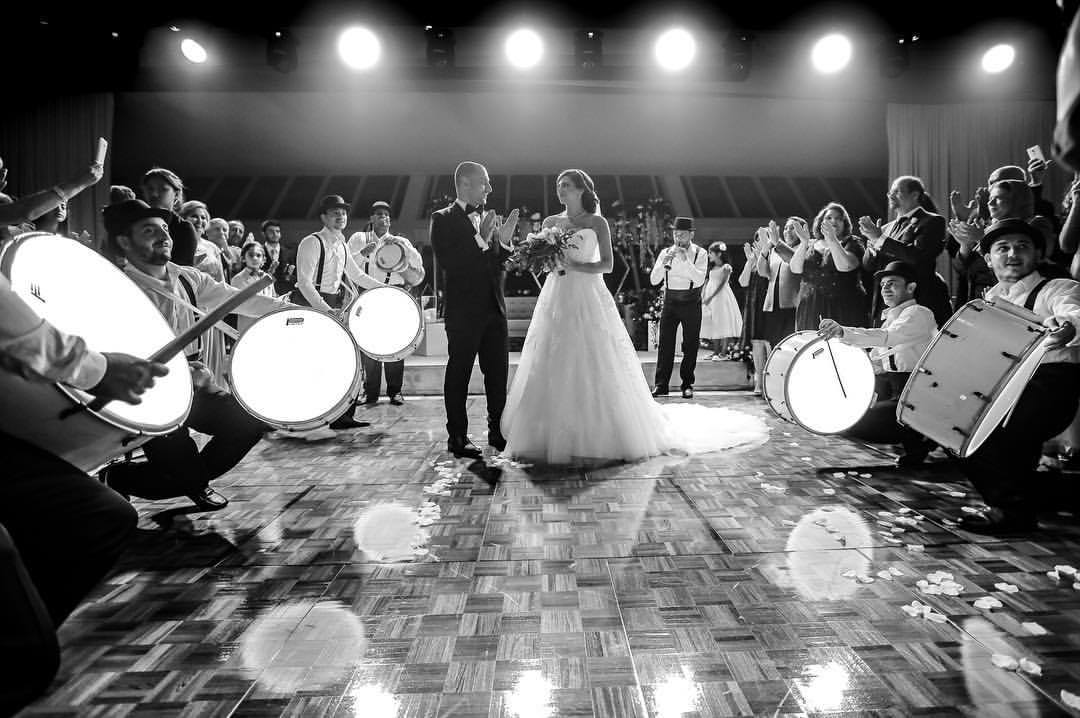
An Arab wedding in Dubai

Whereas perceived beauty is considered a factor, much more importance is given to traditional virtues like modesty, respectable behavior, calm temperament, homeliness, and simplicity. Similar family values and chastity are the typical traits families look for when choosing spouses. Traditionally, the process of investigation takes into consideration the bride's physical beauty, her behavior, her cleanliness, her education, and finally her qualities as a housewife. In carrying out this traditional investigation, parents also take the behavior of the prospective bride's family into account.

Traditionally, the first meeting usually takes place between the bride, groom, and their respective mothers. They meet, usually in a public place or in the bride's house, and get to know each other. The bride, groom, and their chaperones will typically sit separately but within sight of each other in order to get to know each other. In recent history, the man might suggest to his family who he would like them to consider, and it may be that the man and the woman already know each other. It is also common in urban families for a bride and the groom to agree to marry before the groom approaches the bride's family for their permission.

== Tulba ==
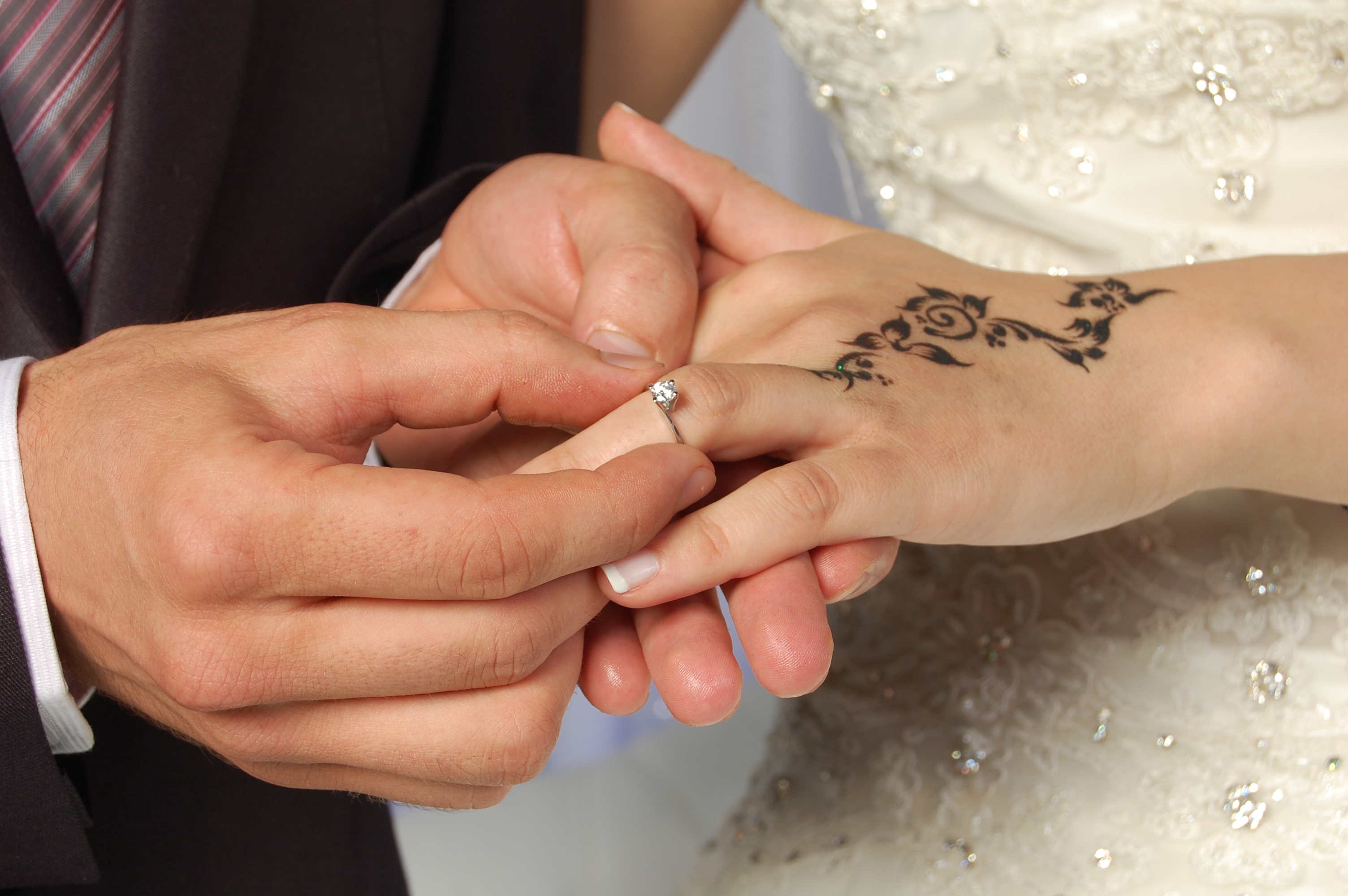
Wear engagement ring during wedding ceremony in Tunisia

Tulba or Tolbe (Arabic: طلبة) is essentially a formal request of hand.The event is more private, limited to the relatives of the bride and groom. This occurs after both families have agreed to the couple's decision to marry. In "Tulpa," the groom, along with his family members, asks the bride, with her family for her part, to lend her hand in marriage. Families then formally recognize that the couple will be married.

== Engagement ==
Engagements (Arabic: خطوبة 'khetbah' in Saudi as well as in earlier Arab and Islamic jurisprudence fiqh. Or called خطوبة 'khutubah' in Egypt and the Levant) in the Arab world usually take place during a simpler wedding party or a dinner for the families. The bride wears any dress she pleases and there is no zaffah procession. Usually, the bride and groom dress in matching colors. They exchange rings, putting the rings on each other's right-hand ring finger.

== Radwa ==
This event usually occurs one or two days before the wedding day. It is a small gathering of close male relatives on both sides of the bride and groom, usually in the home of the bride's family. In this exchange, the men on the groom's side make sure that the bride's family is satisfied with the party. Male family members on the groom side also make sure to resolve any last-minute issues before the wedding. The eldest man on the side of the groom congratulates all the male relatives on both sides.

== Henna night (Ghomrah) ==
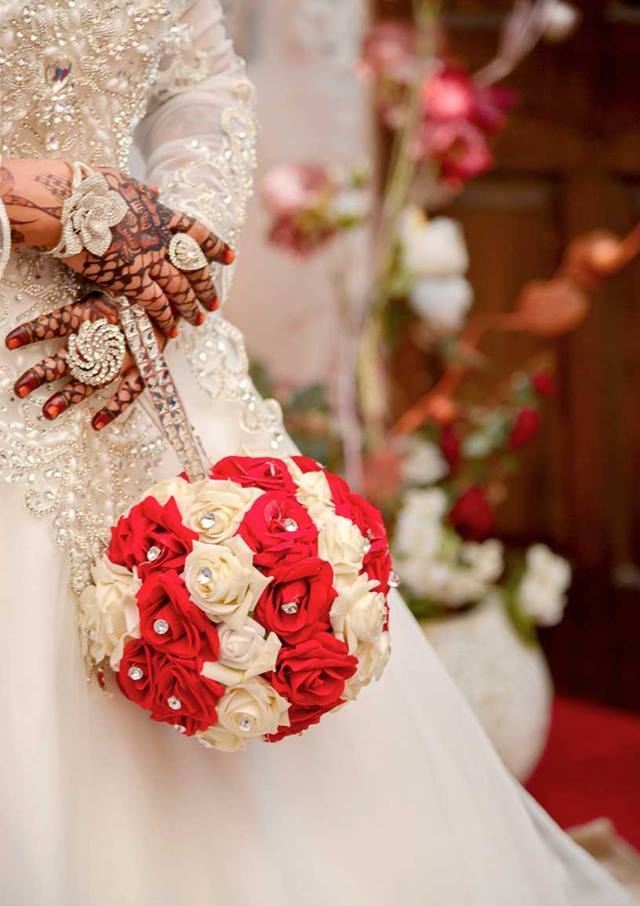
An Arab bride with a basic, hand-tied rose bouquet and henna on her hands

In Old Palestine, the henna night was a night used to prepare all the necessary wedding decorations and last-minute arrangements. It was also a chance for the families to celebrate together before the wedding. The groom's family would sahij, or dance, through the streets of the village until they reached the house of the bride. Once there, the family would mix henna, which would then be used to decorate the bride and groom’s hands (with the groom's being merely the initials of his bride and himself), and then offer the bride her mahr (a Muslim woman's condition for accepting a man into marriage, usually paid in gold as it does not decline in value like other wealth). The families would then dance and sing traditional Palestinian music.

In modern times, particularly for those not living in Palestine, the henna night remains traditional in customs but is very similar to a bachelorette party; the bride's female friends and relatives join her in celebrating, which includes food, drinks, and dancing. A women's group plays Arabic music, sometimes Islamic music, while everyone dances. A woman draws henna or mehndi, a temporary form of skin decoration using henna, on the bride's and guests' skin—usually the palms and feet, where the henna color will be darkest because the skin contains higher levels of keratin there, which binds temporarily to lawsone, the colorant of henna.

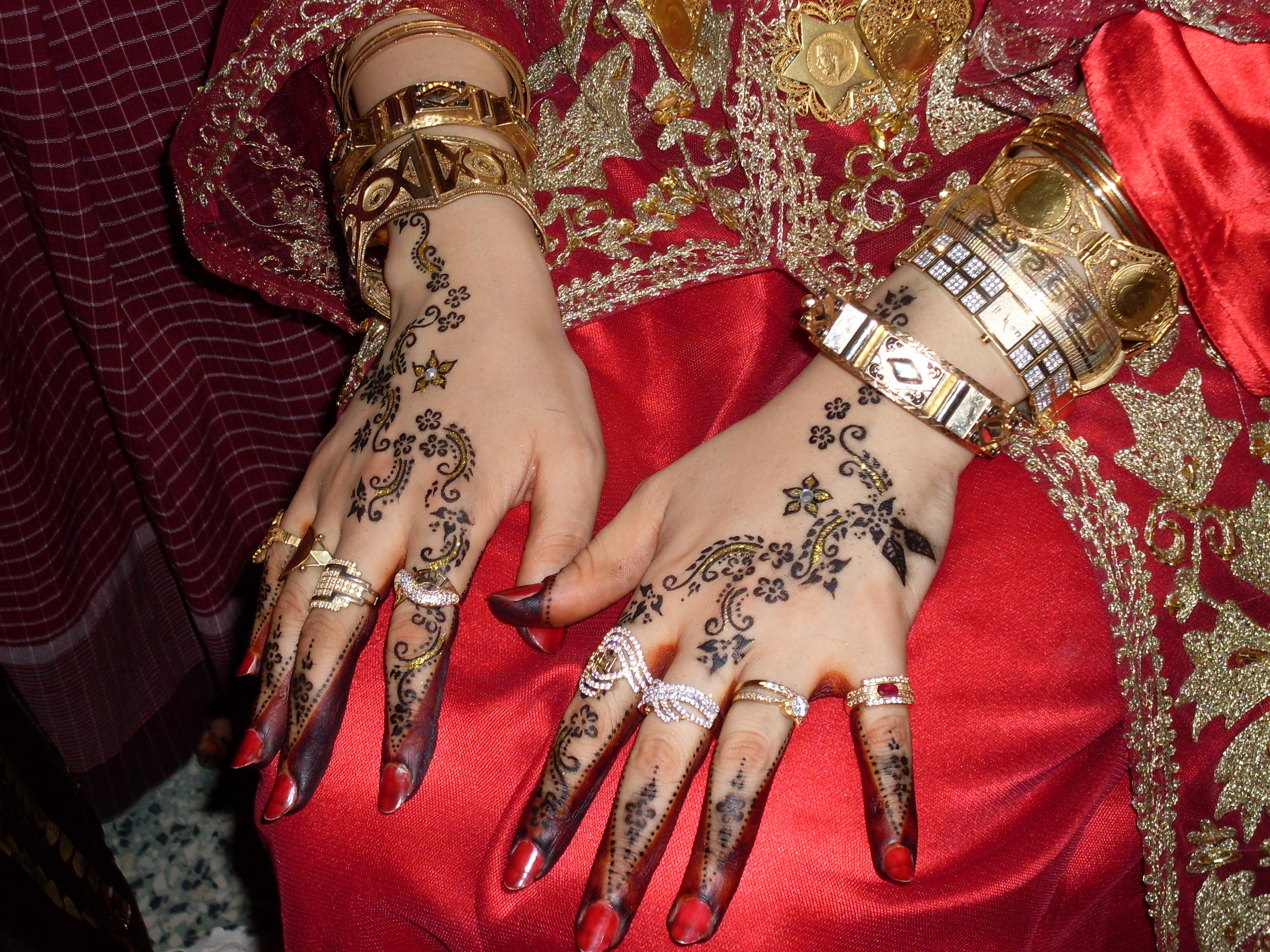
Henna decorations from Djerba, Tunisia

The men will also have a party, in which the groom's family and friends will dance to traditional Palestinian music. In some village customs, the groom's face is shaven by a close family member or friend in preparation for his wedding. The tradition of giving the bride her gold is also still used. The groom will enter where the bride is; they will both get their henna done, and the groom will then offer the bride her mahr. Thus, the wedding is merely a dance and celebration.

An important element of the henna night in both traditional and non-traditional henna parties is the dress adorned by the Palestinian women and the groom. The women dress in traditional (usually hand-embroidered) gowns, known as Palestinian ithyab. The brides would be extravagant and exquisitely embroidered. The groom will wear the usual traditional Arab men's thobe and hata (head covering).

The henna wedding tradition has remained popular with minority Jewish descendants of predominantly Muslim countries.

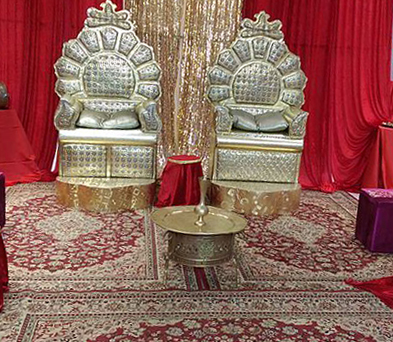
Thrones for the groom and bride at their Moroccan Jewish henna ceremony; edited copy of original

== Sahrah ==
In some areas (e.g., Palestine), the male friends and relatives also celebrate an evening party (sahra in Arabic) in the garden or on the street in front of the groom's house. Music and dance groups perform, and the men dance with the groom. Women are not allowed and may view the program via video projection inside the house or the closed-off garden. In strict Islamic families, this is the only way to allow males from outside the family to attend the wedding.

== Wedding reception/party ==
Weddings usually include a zaffa, a procession that announces the couple's wedding. The zaffa differs from region to region. In Egypt, for example, the Dumiyati zaffa is popular in the north. In the Levant, the traditional dabkeh is popular. Other versions of the zaffa can be found in North Africa and the Arabian Peninsula, as well as the khaliji; the zaffa even reached Malaysia with the first Arab traders, called the Zapin.

=== Urban weddings ===
After the zaffa or zefaf, the bride and the groom (this is mostly in Egypt) sit on a dais, or kosha (كوشة), which usually consists of two comfortable seats in front of the guests, from which the bride and groom reign as though king and queen. As soon as the bride and groom are seated in the kosha, a sharbat drink is passed to the guests, and all drink to their health.

The bride and groom then switch rings from their right hand to their left index finger. With this ritual, the festivities begin. The bride and groom have the first dance, after which the other wedding guests join in. Usually a belly dancer or a singer entertains the guests, but more luxurious weddings will have more than one entertainer. Guests will dance and sing with the newlywed couple, and the groom will sometimes be tossed in the air by friends. In modern weddings, after the formal entertainment, a disc jockey will extend the festivities.

Next comes the cutting of the cake. As is done elsewhere in the world, the bride and groom cut the cake, which is several layers high. The bride then tosses her bouquet behind her back to other hopeful women. By tradition, whoever catches the bouquet is seen as lucky because she is foretold to be the next to marry. Next, the couple opens the buffet for the guests, which is usually a wide variety of salads, meats, stews, sweets, fruits, and other Arab cuisine dishes. Food is considered one of the factors that reflect the wealth of the families of the bride and groom. After the guests have eaten, many of them, particularly those who are not close family or friends of the couple, will leave after congratulating the couple. In some weddings, there may be more entertainment, including a DJ, dancing, and sometimes a singer or band, which continues until very late in the night. The bride and groom then usually receive a complimentary stay of a night or two at the hotel where the wedding was held.

In strict Muslim families, men may not dance with women or even watch women in immodest dresses. So only the female guests and children enter the hall with the wedding couple. Also, photographers and other personnel must be women, and the DJ, if he is male, has to operate behind a closed door. Men wait outside in a separate room or garden. At the end of the party, women cover their shoulders, and male family members may enter the hall. Family by family visits the couple to offer congratulations and money presents. At the end, they may dance together.

Celebratory gunfire is considered one of many practices during Arab weddings. However, these practices are often criticized since they sometimes lead to fatal casualties. For instance, an Iraqi man from Hawija, Iraq, lost control of his weapon and ended up shooting and killing his own son at his wedding in June 2020.

=== Rural weddings ===
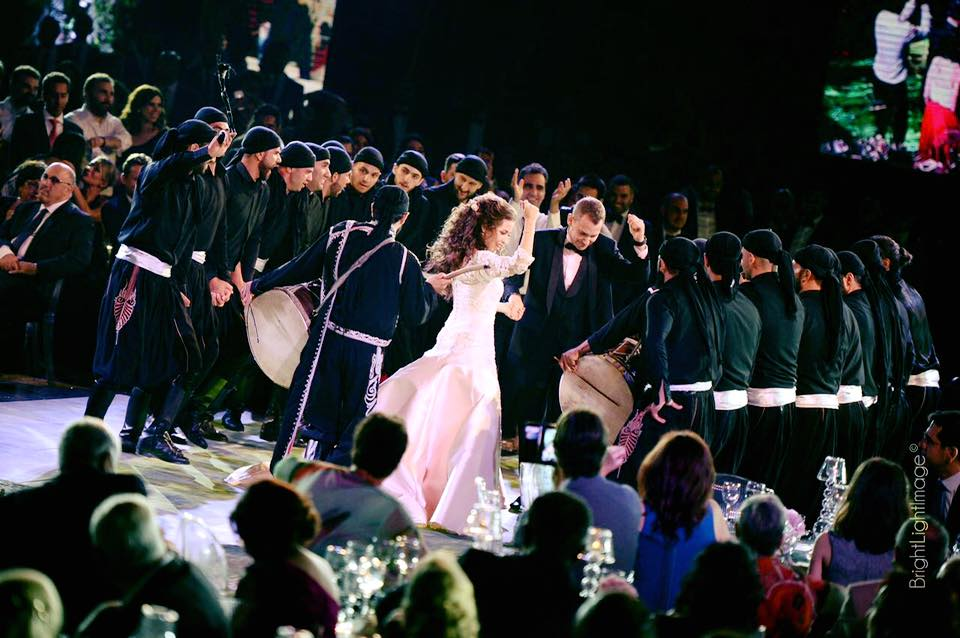
Arabic wedding (Zaffa) dancing Dabke

Modern urban weddings are influenced by Western traditions—for example, the cutting of the cake and tossing of the bouquet. This is not the case with rural areas, or, for example, most parts of Saudi Arabia, where they still do the original traditional Arab Islamic wedding style. In rural areas of countries like Egypt, after the zaffa, the wedding ceremony will usually take place in a big clearing, where a huge tent called a sewan (صوان) has been set up. The entertainment includes a belly dancer or singer, sometimes both. Drinks are passed to guests, and food is served on huge plates. The customary food is fattah, pieces of lamb meat embedded in rice and bread dipped in stew. The bride and groom will leave the wedding early, but the guests will continue the festivities.

== Islamic practices ==
=== Reading of the Fatiha ===
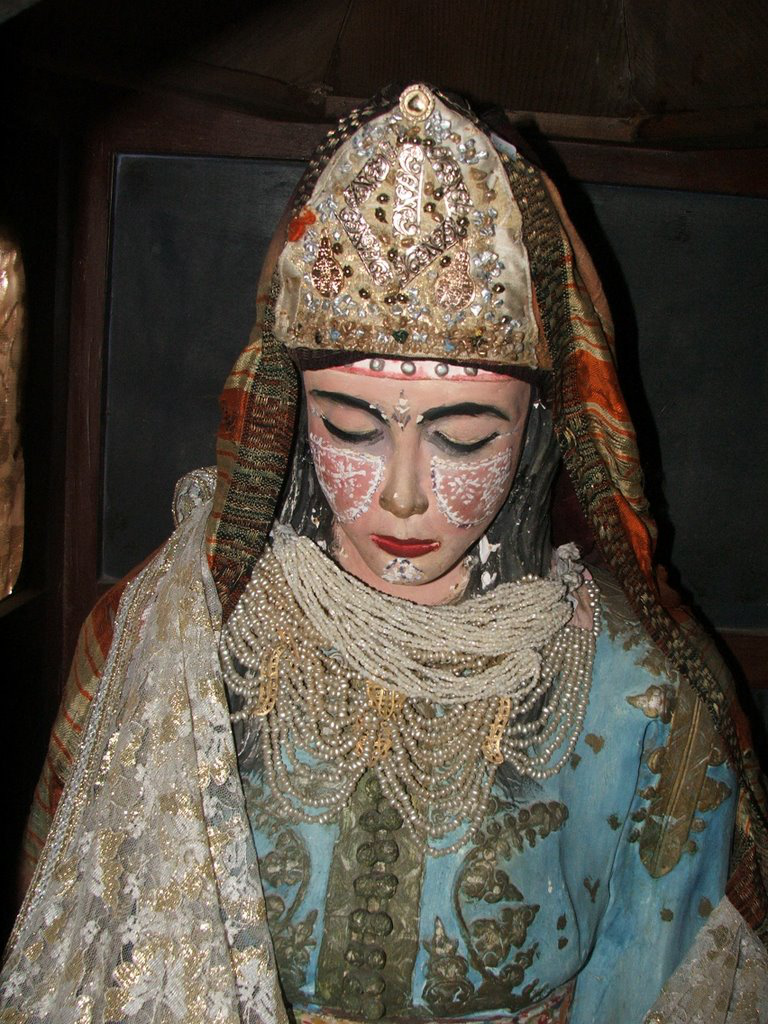
An Arab Jebala wedding costume

In Egypt and parts of Palestine and Jordan, the bride's family hosts a reception in their home, where the groom formally asks for the bride's hand in marriage from her father or the eldest man in the family. After the father agrees, the families read the Fatiha (the first sura in the Quran) and serve sharbat, a sweet cordial prepared from flowers or fruit (usually in Egypt) or Arabic coffee (usually in the Levant).

=== Marriage contract ===
The marriage contract, called Aqd Nikah, Aqd Qiran, Aqd Zawaj, and Katb el-Kitab, is the focus of the official marriage ceremony. It starts with a sheikh or imam giving a short speech about how the Prophet honored his wives, how to honor women, and how women should treat their husbands and honor them. Then the imam tells the groom to heed the speech that was just given, and the father (or eldest male of the bride's family) accepts the proposal. The ceremony resembles the reading of the Fatiha but is also when the legal documents are filled out and then filed. Two witnesses, usually the eldest men in each family, sign their names to the marriage contract, and the couple is now officially married.

In the Levant, this event is usually held in the house of either the bride or the groom's family, or sometimes in the wedding hall itself, in a mosque, or in court if the couple decides to do so.

=== Interfaith Marriages ===
Interfaith marriages are not common but do occur in Arab societies. Approximately 6 percent of the marriages in Lebanon are interfaith marriages. Interfaith marriage is complex step in Lebanon where the system is sectarian: citizenship and sect are patrilineally inherited. In order to marry, Lebanese citizens have to marry according one of the fifteen personal status laws in the Lebanese state. Women often marry according to the personal status law of the husband, but there are also cases of conversion to another faith. Couples who do not wish to change their faith or adhere to a certain personal status law, opt for a civil marriage abroad and/or the renunciation of their sect in their identity documents.

== Christian practices ==
The large minority of Arab Christians, who mainly live in the Levant region and in Egypt, belong mainly to Catholic and Orthodox Christian Churches and they use ancient Christian symbolic traditions in their weddings.
