= Zapin Api =

Malay traditional dance

- Origin: Indonesia

Zapin Api (lit: "Zapin of Fire"; Jawi: زاڤين اڤي) is a firedance technique of the classical Malay Zapin founded in Pulau Rupat Utara, Bengkalis, Riau, Indonesia. The identifying characteristic of Zapin Api is the incorporation of fire and strong focus on the mystical elements. The dance form was historically dormant and extinct for nearly 40 years before its revival in 2013.

== Origin ==
=== The legends of Tari Api ===
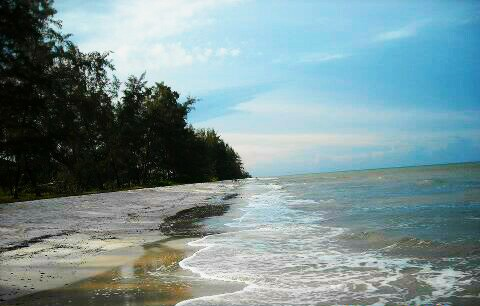
The shores of Pulau Rupat witnessed an exodus of Malays arriving from Malacca in 1511, thus becoming the ancestors for most of the islanders today.

The dance traced its origin from the precursor Tari Api ritual performed by the people of Pulau Rupat. The area was settled by the Malay refugees who fled from the turmoil in Malacca, after the fall of the kingdom to the Portuguese hands in 1511.

The legend attested that Pulau Rupat was cursed under a series of catastrophes in the 1500s and a harmonious balance between all of the elements should be called for in order to restore peace in the area. This led the islanders under the leadership of Panglima Sage Dagendang, a representative from the Malaccan courts to seek the assistance from the four Pawang Besar (Great Mystique) of four natural elements: earth, fire, wind and water. The mystique agreed upon their request and summoned the jins (spirits) from the each respective elements for reconciliation.

All of the jins accepted the invitation to meet with the mystique, except the fire spirit. He demanded that he only would arrive in the entourage with a condition, that a special celebration would be held for him. The mystique agrees and he asked the spectators to take of their clothes and usher the arrival of the fire jin.

The jin arrives and the mystique became his intermediate between the real world and the spiritual underworld. Thus, commencing the reconciliation process between the two entities. The fire spirit sets the rules and regulations for the performance, together with the condition that the elements of fire should be used in the dance and added mantra that the mortals should abide during the performance, thus signifying birth of the Tari Api.

=== Zapin Api ===
The arrival of the Arab-Acehnese Islamic missionaries transformed the ideals of the classical Tari Api. The traditional paganistic mantras and rituals were complemented with religious prayers and worshiping. The dance emulated the fusion and the cultural accumulation between the traditional Arab Zaffa with the Zapin form of the Malays. In contrast to the predominantly Sufi-infused Arabic Zaffa, the strong element of the cultural mysticism of the Malay was present in the performance.

The dance form was widely staged by the Bengkalis Malay community, especially during the major festival and celebrations in the area including in the wedding receptions, circumcision ceremony and the ritualistic Safar Bath. However, the meteoric rise of the new form of entertainments in the area resulted the gradual death of Zapin, superseded by the modern-karaoke and Dangdut celebrations by the locals. By the 1980s, the fatal blow was hit and the Zapin Api performance was declared extinct in the area.

=== Resurrection ===
By 2013, by the initiative of Pak Edwar, the head of the Bengkalis Tourism Department requested Pak Abdullah, the ringmaster of the traditional Zapin Api, for a revival of the traditional dance art in the area. He enthusiastically began to recruit young men and nurture them about the Malay art form. Thus, commencing his journey on resurrecting the once extinct zapin api. Not long after, the dance is once again being staged in the island.

== Performance ==
=== Philosophy ===
Based on the observation by Tom Ibnur, a Zapin-enthusiast, he observed that Zapin Zapi was a true fusion between the Arabic Zaffa which was orchestrated as a form of religious entertainment by the Islamic missionaries with the indigenous Malay firedance. The element of Zapin can be witnessed in the form of the rhythms and the coordinations, while the native pre-Islamic elements can clearly observed when the performers was in an unconscious hallucinations and hypnotic euphoria during the climax of the dance.

=== The dance ===
There are several strict rituals that must be adhered to by the ringleader, players and even the spectators. All the dancers, musicians and the instruments are required be bathed in sacred water and smoked by mantras a few days before the performance. While during the Zapin, it is strongly prohibited for the spectators to light up any fires nor call the players name.

The performance begins when the participants reciting prayers with the burning incense. The court was then set with Bonfire made from burning coconut shell, as a preparation of the dance. The leader recite his mantras and commencing the Malay orchestra in the background to summon the spirits. He intensifies his mantras as the music plays along.

The players dance along with the orchestra, slowly one by one succumbed into a spellbinded position and drawn directly into the fire. They continued to dance erratically while playing with the fiery coconut shell. Some would collapse in ecstasy during the performance.

When the music is set, the stage is alight and the zapin commenced, the performers usually recalled that the staged was suddenly transformed into a beautiful orchard and they were accompanied by a nymph who had suddenly emerged and leading them to dance. The performance may last several hours long, drawing many of the performers became unconscious after induced in a cataleptic affair.

The Zapin would only ends based on the discretion of the ringleader. Ironically, there was no sign of burning on the skins of the performers, despite spending hours of dwelling in the blazing fire.

=== Contemporary development ===
The dance slowly gained wide recognition and interest following its revival from the stage of Bengkalis since 2013. The government of Riau Province also hailed the dance as among the components of the local tourist industry, drawing local and international crowds alike to witness its mystical performance.

== See also ==
- Zapin
- Malay Indonesian
- Randai

== Bibliography ==
- M. Hapis (2017), Asal Muasal Seni Tari Zapin Api Rupat Utara – Wisata Budaya di Kabupaten Bengkalis, RiauMagz
- Putur Fajar Arcana (2017), Putur Fajar Arcana, Kompas
- Rangkuti (2016), Zapin Api, National Geographic Indonesia, archived from the original on 2017-11-16
- Syahnan Rangkuti (2016), Zapin Api, Kompas
- Wiwik Setiawati (2016), Tari Zapin Api, Budaya Melayu Riau yang Anti Mainstream, Infoyunik
