= Bajjaria =

Lamb dish popular in Syria

Al-Bajjaria
- Alternative names: البجارية, ālbǧāryh, Al-bujari
- Course: Main course
- Place of origin: Deir ez-Zor, Syria
- Region or state: Levant

Al-Bajjaria or Al-bujari (Arabic: البجارية, ālbǧāryh) is a Syrian dish originating in Deir ez-Zor, usually offered at events and weddings have been named Bajjaria relative to the tribe Baggara.

== Components ==
Al-bajjaria is a mutton lamb cooked only ghee and placed after cooking on a number of loaves of unleavened bread orsheet, which is cut and placed in the mince and placed aside some green onions and radish as a kind of ornamental.

== Preparation ==
Add water with the addition of onions, salt, bay leaf, pepper red, cloves and cinnamon to give special food flavor, and after preparing is poured out in Manasef which is placed tandoor bread.
