= Zapin =

Malay dance

Zafin
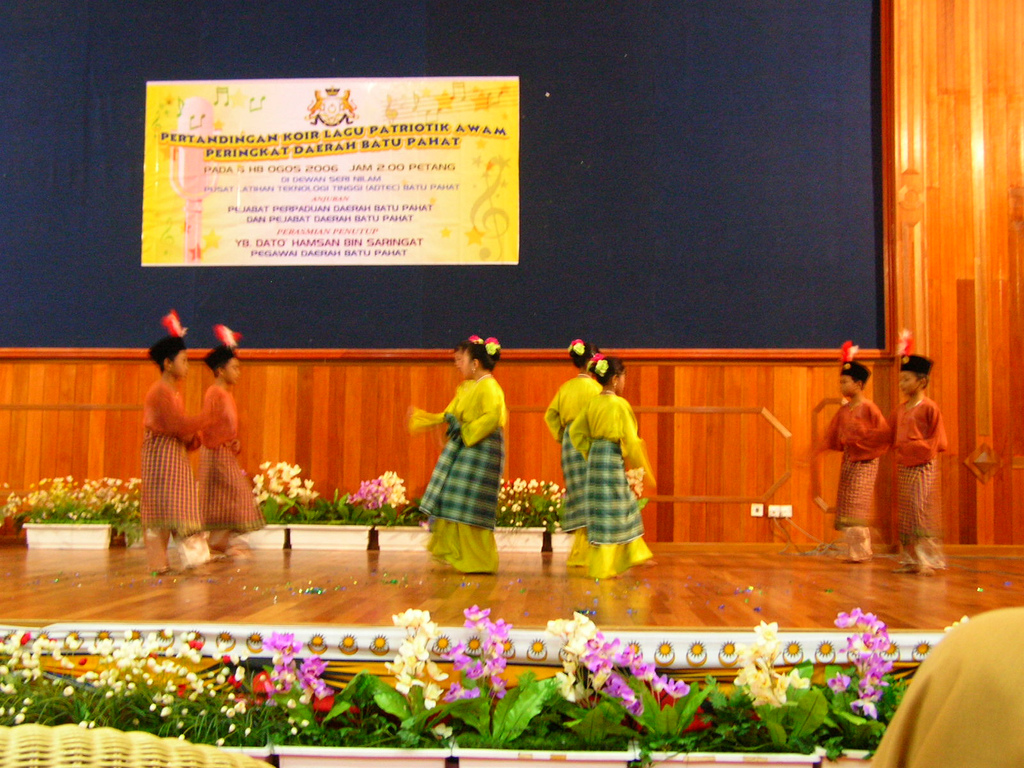
- Schoolchildren performing Zapin in Batu Pahat, Johor.
- Native name: Zafin, Japin, Jepin, Jepen
- Etymology: Arabic: الزفن, romanized: Al-Zafn
- Instrument(s): Gambus, Gendang, Marawis, Rebana
- Inventor: Persian, Arabs, Malays
- Origin: Hadramaut, Yemen. Malay World

Zapin (Jawi: زافين) is one of the most popular dance and musical forms in traditional Malay performing arts. Dance movements are choreographed to melodies, which are performed using musical instruments such as the gambus (short-necked lute), accordion, and rebana. It is believed to have been introduced by Persian and Arab Muslim missionaries from the Middle East to the Malay Archipelago around the fourteenth century, where back then only males were allowed to perform; nowadays, female dancers are included. It had been performed exclusively for religious ceremonies, but through the years, it has become a form of traditional entertainment, hence the participation of female dancers is allowed.

In September 2026, Singapore, Brunei Darussalam, Indonesia, and Malaysia announced a joint nomination of zapin for inscription on UNESCO's Representative List of the Intangible Cultural Heritage of Humanity, with the nomination expected to be submitted in March 2027.

== Instruments ==
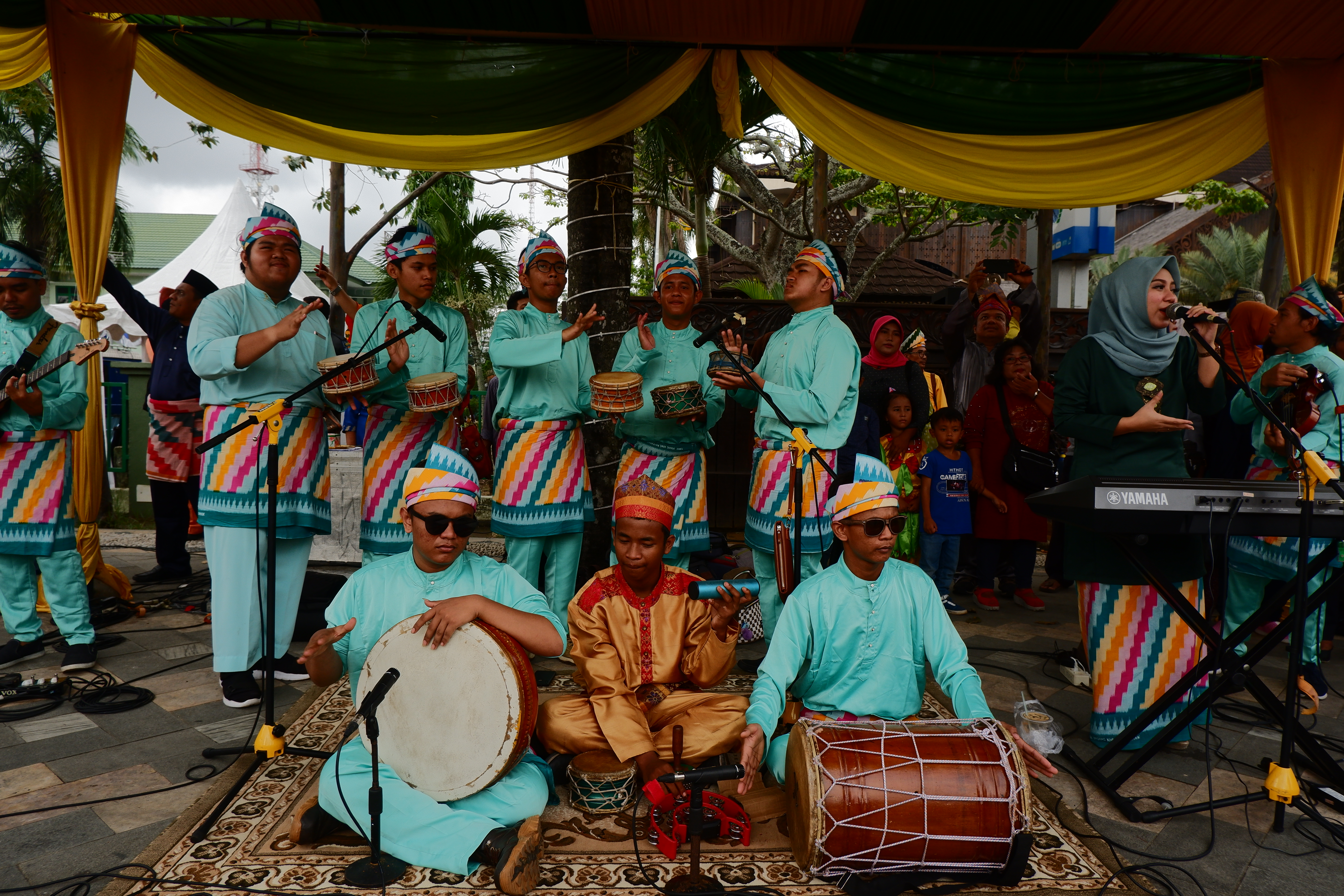
Zapin instruments played among the Pontianak Malays of West Kalimantan.

The dancers usually perform in pairs and are accompanied by musicians playing the accordion, violin, gambus, gendang, marwas/marawis, and rebana.

== Distributions ==
Presently, zapin remains an integral part of the regional Malay performing arts scene, particularly in Malaysia, Brunei Darussalam, Indonesia and Singapore. In Malaysia, Zapin is mostly associated with the Malaysian southern state of Johor. In Indonesia, Zapin is mostly associated and classified as part of Malay cultures, especially in terms of traditional dances and traditions in Malay-populated areas in Sumatra, Riau Islands, Bangka Belitung Islands, and Kalimantan.

== Types ==
There are numerous types of Zapin, and each type varies by the movement and style of dance:

- Zapin 12 Kuala Kampar (Pelalawan and Penyalai)
- Zapin Api (Riau)
- Zapin Anak Ayam (North Sumatra)
- Zapin Asli (North Sumatra)
- Zapin Banjar (Banjarmasin)
- Zapin Batuah (South Kalimantan)
- Zapin Bedana (Lampung)
- Zapin Bengkalis (Bengkalis, Riau)
- Zapin performance at Singapore's Malay Heritage Centre.
  Zapin Betawi (Jakarta)
- Zapin Brunei (Brunei and North Borneo)
- Zapin Bujang (Riau)
- Zapin Bujang Marindu (South Kalimantan)
- Zapin Carita (Banjarmasin)
- Zapin Cek Esah (Riau Islands)
- Zapin Dana (Jambi, South Sumatra and Bengkulu)
- Zapin Dana-Dana (Gorontalo)
- Zapin Dana-Dani (Nusa Tenggara)
- Zapin Dana Sarah (Jambi)
- Zapin Dara (Riau and West Sumatra)
- Zapin Deli (Deli Serdang, North Sumatra)
- Zapin Diang Marindu (South Kalimantan)
- Zapin Dua Saudara (South Kalimantan)
- Zapin Duo (Riau)
- Zapin Empat-Empat (West Kalimantan)
- Zapin Eroh (Kutai Kartanegara, East Kalimantan)
- Zapin Galuh Langkar South Kalimantan
- Zapin Gambus (Perak)
- Zapin Genjoh (Mahakam)
- Zapin Ghalet (Kedah)
- Zapin Hadrah (South Kalimantan)
- Zapin Istana (Siak)
- Zapin Jambi (Jambi)
- Zapin Kaltara (North Kalimantan)
- Zapin Kamang (West Sumatra)
- Zapin Kampong Bolak (Riau)
- Zapin Kampung Manggis (Jambi)
- Zapin Kasih dan Budi (South Sumatra and Riau)
- Zapin Kepri (Riau Islands)
- Zapin Kerinci (Kerinci, Jambi)
- Zapin Keris (West Kalimantan)
- Zapin Kinsat Suara Siam (North Kalimantan)
- Zapin Kipas (West Kalimantan and Riau)
- Zapin Kores (Johor)
- Zapin Kuala (Banjar Kuala, South Kalimantan)
- Zapin Kute (Riau Islands)
- Zapin Lancang Kuning (Riau)
- Zapin Langkah (West Kalimantan)
- Zapin Langkah Bujur Serong (Pontianak, West Kalimantan)
- Zapin Langkah Penghibur Pengantin (West Kalimantan)
- Zapin Langkah Simpang (Pontianak, West Kalimantan)
- Zapin Lapis Batu Putih (Johor)
- Zapin Lembut (West Kalimantan)
- Zapin Lenga (Johor)
- Zapin Lenggang Banua (South Kalimantan)
- Zapin Lenggok Gambus (Pekan Labuhan, North Sumatra)
- Zapin Mabuk Kepayang (North Sumatra)
- Zapin Maharani (Pelalawan)
- Zapin Mandiling (Bawean)
- Zapin Marhum Pekan (Pekanbaru)
- Zapin Massal (West Kalimantan)
- Zapin Melayu (Riau)
- Zapin Melayu Johor (Johor)
- Zapin Melayu Pontianak (Pontianak)
- Zapin Meskom (Bengkalis, Riau)
- Zapin Nelayan (Riau)
- Zapin Padang Changkat (Perak)
- Zapin Padang Sari (Johor)
- Zapin Palembang (Palembang)
- Zapin Parit Lengkong (West Kalimantan)
- Zapin Parit Mastar (Johor)
- Zapin Pasanggrahan (South Kalimantan)
- Zapin Pat Lipat (Johor)
- Zapin Payung (West Kalimantan)
- Zapin Pecah Dua Belas (Pelalawan)
- Zapin Pekajang (Johor)
- Zapin Pekan (Riau, Sumatra)
- Zapin Penyengat (Penyengat)
- Zapin Persebatian (Pekanbaru)
- Zapin Pesisir (Riau Islands)
- Zapin Pintal Tali Sukadana (West Kalimantan)
- Zapin Pisau (Pontianak, West Kalimantan)
- Zapin Pulau (Johor)
- Zapin Putar Alam (Johor)
- Zapin Rantauan (South Kalimantan)
- Zapin Rao (Rao, Pasaman, West Sumatra)
- Zapin Rindu-Rindu (South Kalimantan)
- Zapin Rotan (West Kalimantan)
- Zapin Salor (Kelantan)
- Zapin Sebat (Sarawak)
- Zapin Seberang (Jambi)
- Zapin Sekaki (North Sumatera)
- Zapin Selat Panjang (Selat Panjang)
- Zapin Selendang (West Kalimantan)
- Zapin Sengarong (Sanggau, West Kalimantan)
- Zapin Senggayong (North Kayong, West Kalimantan)
- Zapin Sentak Kamang (Padangpanjang, West Sumatra)
- Zapin Serdang (Serdang, North Sumatra)
- Zapin Seri Bunian (Pekalongan and Johor)
- Zapin Siak (Siak)
- Zapin Siak Bermadah (Siak)
- Zapin Siak Sri Indrapura (Siak)
- Zapin Sigam (Sigam, South Kalimantan)
- Zapin Sindang (Sarawak)
- Zapin Singapura (Singapore)
- Zapin Sisit (South Kalimantan)
- Zapin Sungei Kallang (Singapore)
- Zapin Susun Sirih (West Kalimantan)
- Zapin Tahtul (South Kalimantan)
- Zapin Tali (West Kalimantan)
- Zapin Tali Bui (West Kalimantan)
- Zapin Tamiang (Aceh Tamiang)
- Zapin Tanjung Labuh (Johor)
- Zapin Telok Blangah (Singapore)
- Zapin Tembung (West Kalimantan)
- Zapin Tembung Pendek (Pontianak, West Kalimantan)
- Zapin Tempurung (Melawi, West Kalimantan)
- Zapin Tenglu (Johor)
- Zapin Tidung Ulu (Tana Tidung, North Kalimantan)
- Zapin Tuan Haji (South Kalimantan)
- Zapin Tuan Syarif (South Kalimantan)
- Zapin Tongga (Minangkabau)

== See also ==
- Zaffa
