= Mirwas =

Unpitched percussion instrument

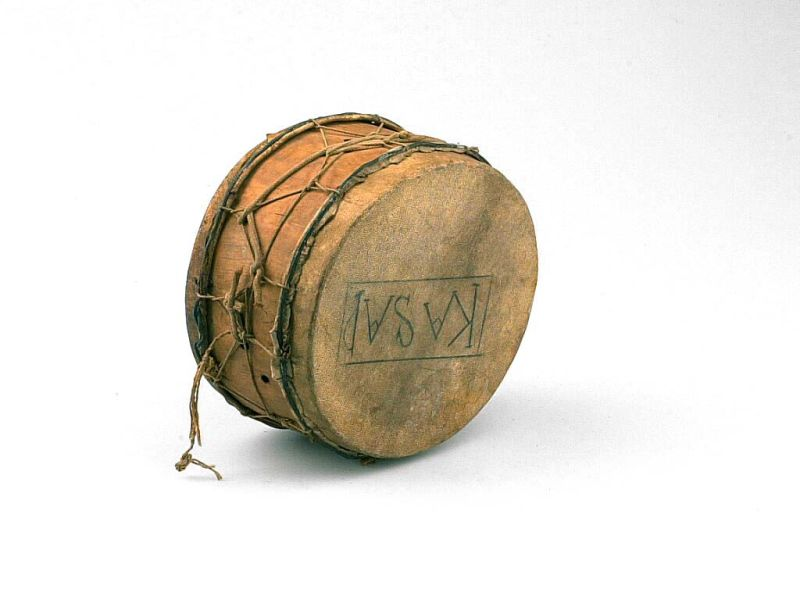
Mirwas drum

The mirwās or marwas (Arabic: مرواس), plural marāwīs (Arabic: مراويس) is a small double-sided, high-pitched hand drum originally from the Middle East. It is a popular instrument in the Arab States of the Persian Gulf, used in sawt and fijiri music. It is also common in Kuwait and Yemen.

Hadhrami migrants from Yemen took the instrument to Muslim Southeast Asia (especially Indonesia, Malaysia and Brunei), where it is used in Zapin and Gambus musical genres. A similar drum of this area is the Gendang.

The Marwas drums used to accompany Gambus music in Lampung, Indonesia often consist of four sizes with two skins of a diameter between 12-20 centimetres. The skins are commonly made from goatskin and formerly black monkey skin and are laced with leather or plastic to a jackfruit-wood cylindrical body of around 8 to 10 centimetres in height.

== See also ==
- Qanbus
- Zapin
