= Qanbūs =

Chordophone of Southern Asia

Qanbūs (قنبوس)
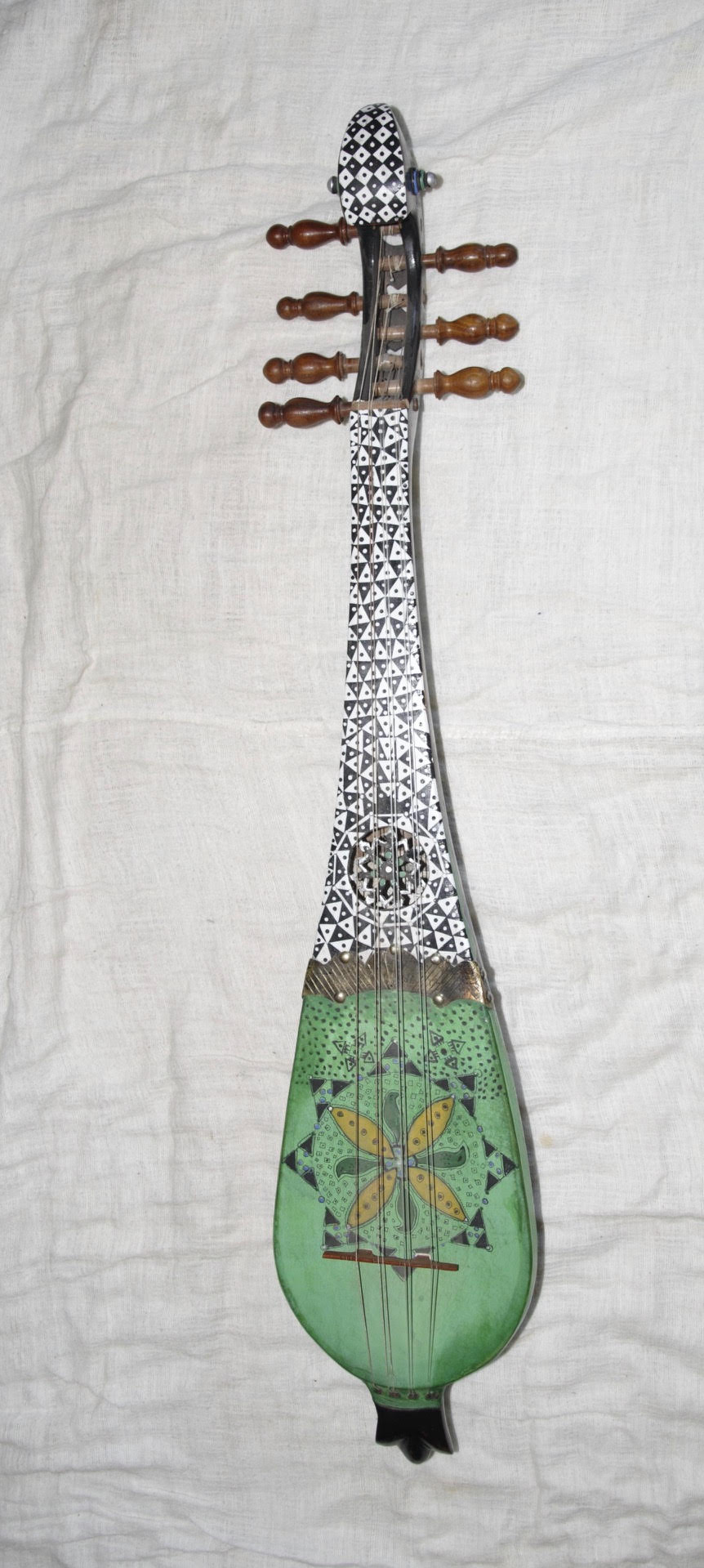
- Yemeni qanbūs with 6 strings running in pairs, and an additional base string.

String instrument
- Other names: Gambus
- Hornbostel–Sachs classification: 321.321 (Necked-bowl lute, instruments in which sound is produced by one or more vibrating strings (chordophones, string instruments), in which the resonator and string bearer are physically united and can not be separated without destroying the instrument, in which the strings run in a plane parallel to the sound table (lutes), in which the string bearer is a plain handle (handle lutes), whose body is shaped like a bowl (necked bowl lutes).)
- Developed: Developed in Yemen, possibly from barbat. Transferred to Indonesia (and to a wider extent including Malay world countries), where further developed into new forms.

Musicians
- Hussein Moheb

Composers
- Mohamed Al-Ghoom

Sana'a al-Haneen, performed by Hussain Moheb

A qanbūs (Arabic: قنبوس) is a short-necked lute that originated in Yemen and spread throughout the Arabian Peninsula. Sachs considered that it derived its name from the Turkic komuz, but it is more comparable to the oud. The instrument was related to or a descendant of the barbat, a (possibly) skin-topped lute from Central Asia. The qanbūs has 6 or 7 nylon strings that are plucked with a plectrum to generate sound. Unlike many other lute-family instruments, the gambus has no frets. Its popularity declined in Yemen during the early 20th century reign of Imam Yahya; by the beginning of the 21st century, the oud had replaced the qanbūs as the instrument of choice for Middle-Eastern lutenists.

Khatar Ghusn al-Qana performed by Husain Moheb

Yemen migration saw the instrument spread to different parts of the Indian Ocean. In Muslim Southeast Asia (especially Indonesia, Malaysia and Brunei), called the gambus, it sparked a whole musical genre of its own. Nowadays it is played in the traditional dance of Zapin and other genres, such as the Malay ghazal and an ensemble known as kumpulan gambus ("gambus group"). In the Comoros it is known as gabusi, and in Zanzibar as gabbus.

== In Yemen and Oman ==
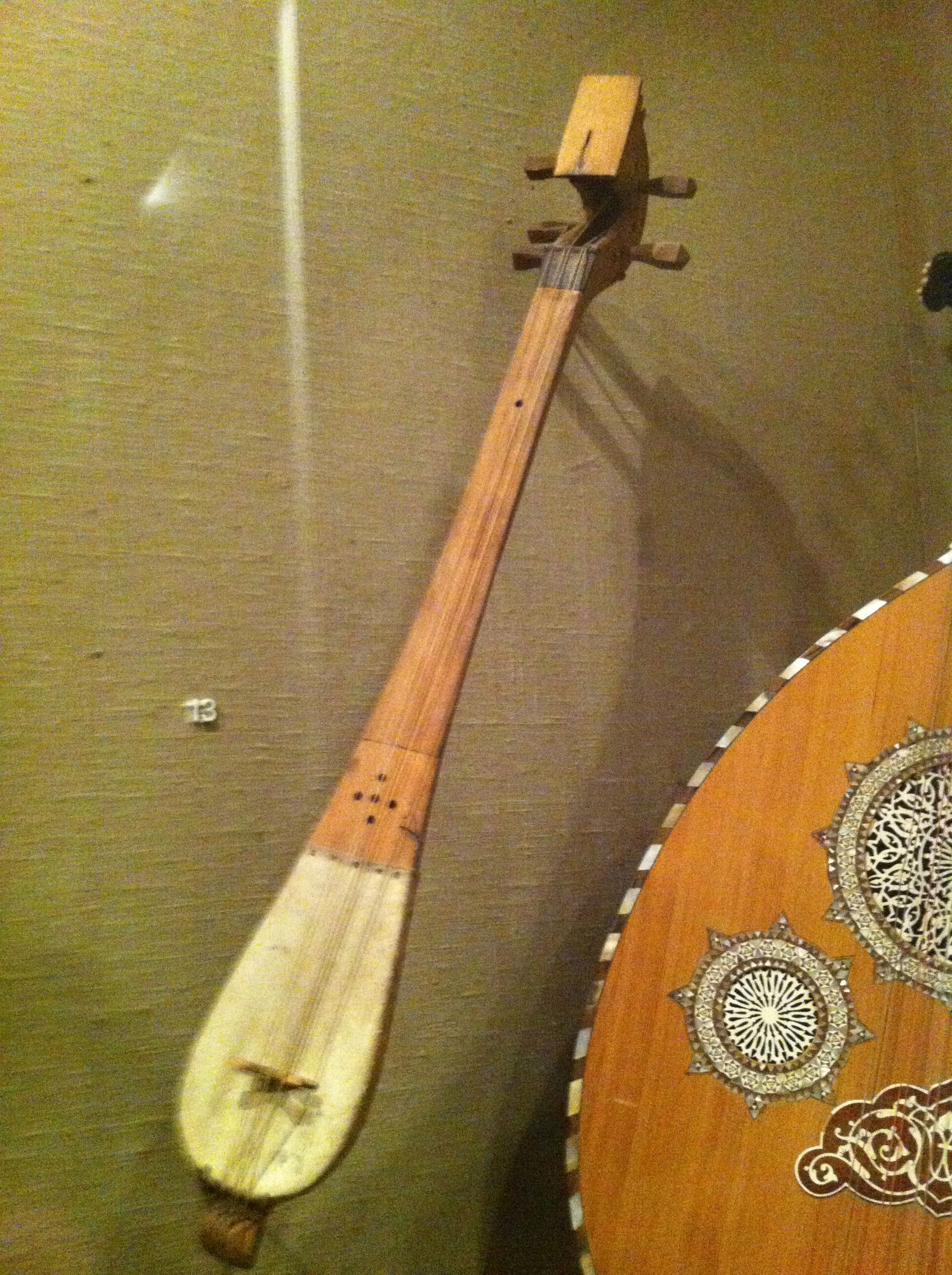
A qanbus displayed in the instrument collection of The Metropolitan Museum of Art in New York City. Labeled as "Syria. 89.4.394".

The qanbus is a traditional instrument from Yemen carved from a single block of wood. It is also played in Oman, where it is called gabbus. The lower half of the top is covered in skin, and the upper half has a wooden soundboard, often with small soundholes. It has a floating bridge, a sickle-shaped pegbox and usually 7 nylon or gut strings in 4 courses, with the lowest course single. There also exist 3-course versions, with 6 or 5 strings, though these are less common.

The Yemeni lute has 7 strings in four courses, tuned low note to high C DD GG CC. The first C string is a single string; strings D G and C are all pairs.

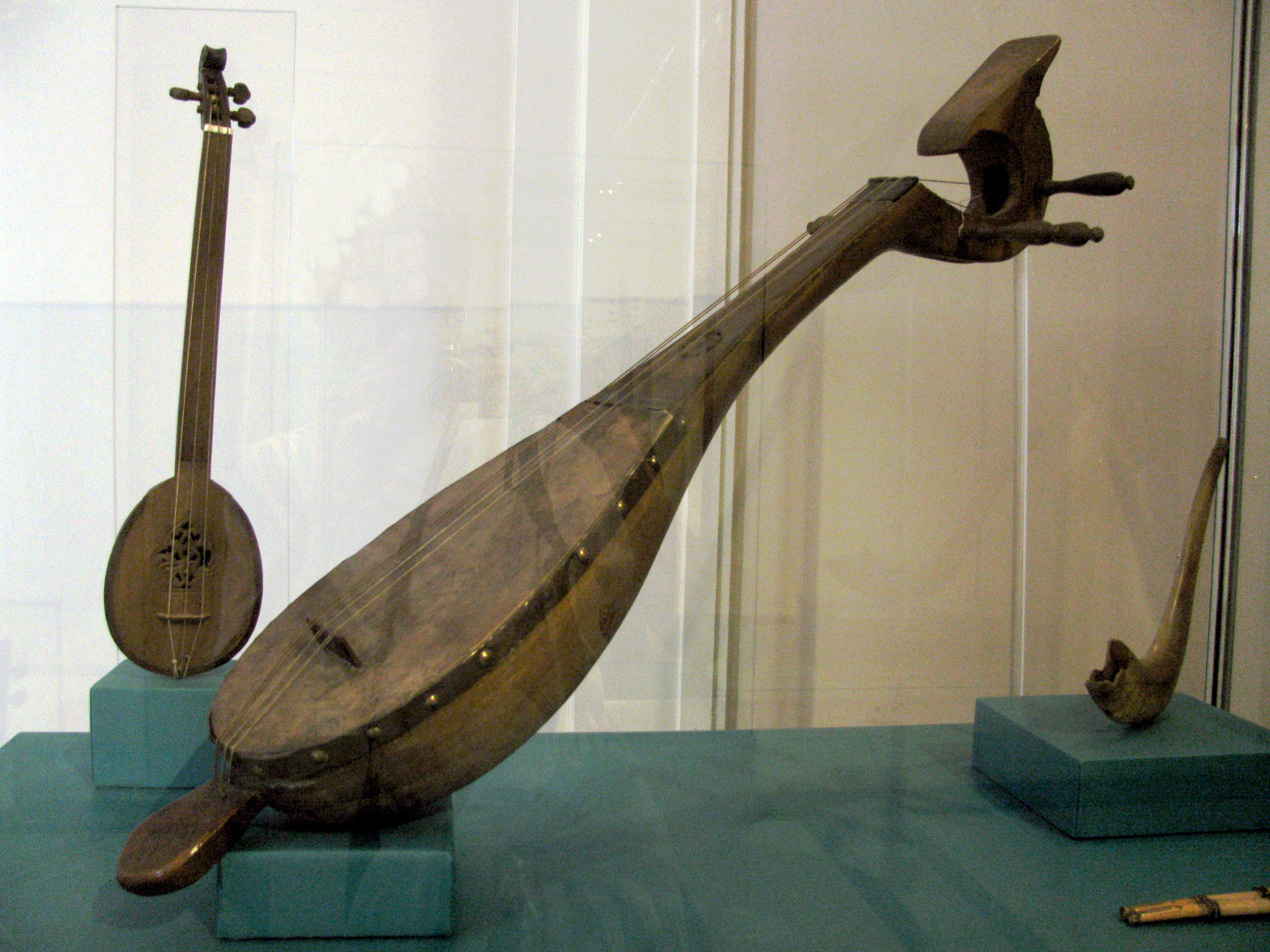
A qanbūs lute in the Kunsthistorisches Museum in Vienna, with 6 strings organized into 3 pairs.

== In East Africa ==
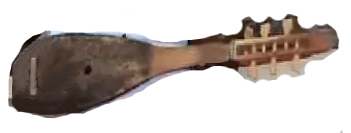
A gabusi from the Comoros Islands. Same as the Indonesian gambus.

In Kenya and Tanzania, a related instrument was called the Kibangala. It used to be built and strung in the same way as the Qanbus. In the Comoros islands, a related instrument called the Gambusi is played, which is built in the same way but often has a flat-shaped pegbox, rather than the sickle-shape, and sometimes has a differently shaped soundbox. Both usually have 4 courses of strings, which can be double or single. Several structural nuances exist between the original design (Anjouan, Mwali) and the later avatars in Mayotte. The corrupted pronunciations Gaboussi, Gabusi, or Gaboussa are also found in Mayotte, and obviously preaches for a joined etymology with the Kabosy chordophone in N-W Madagascar.

== In Southeast Asia ==
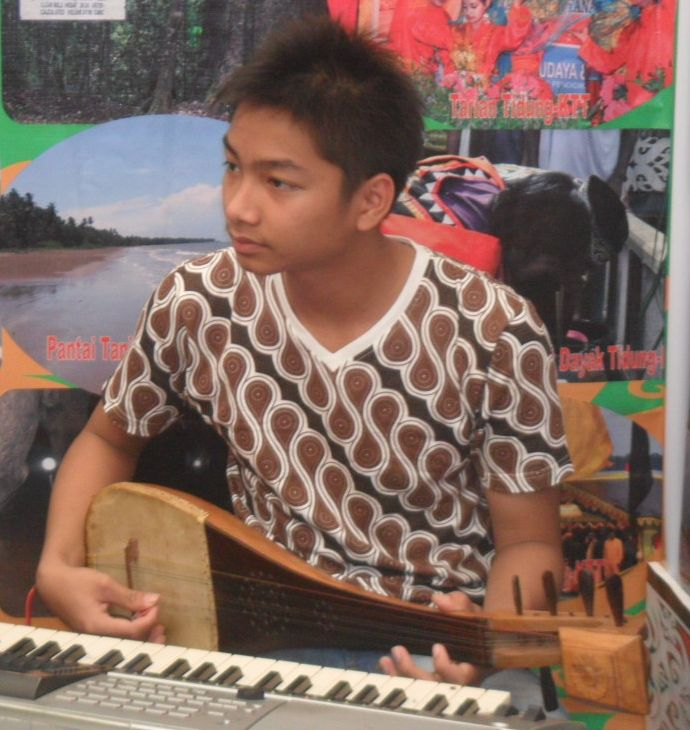
A boy playing a gambus Melayu in Indonesia.

The word gambus (Jawi: ݢمبوس) covers a variety of string instruments in the Malay world; some with skin soundboards, some with wooden, the gambus Melayu shaped like the Yemeni quanbūs, and the gambus Hadhramaut shaped like the Arabian oud. The instruments may have 3, 4 or 5 courses of strings, plus a single base string. To avoid confusion, various descriptors are used in the names by academic researchers.

The instruments are different than the Hasapi boat lutes. The instruments were "transmitted" from the Muslim world to the Malay world at an undermined time. Links to the Middle East begin as early as the 5th-6th centuries C.E., with trading networks and occupation in the 15th century. Experts have tentatively given dates for the instruments' arrival between the 9th and 15th centuries C.E. In looking for origins, musicologists have also noted some similarities with the Chinese pipa.

The two types of gambus likely arrived at different times; the gambus Melayu likely arriving the same time as the quanbus or barbat and developing over centuries, while the gambus Hadhramaut likely developed later in the 19th century after the arrival of the oud.

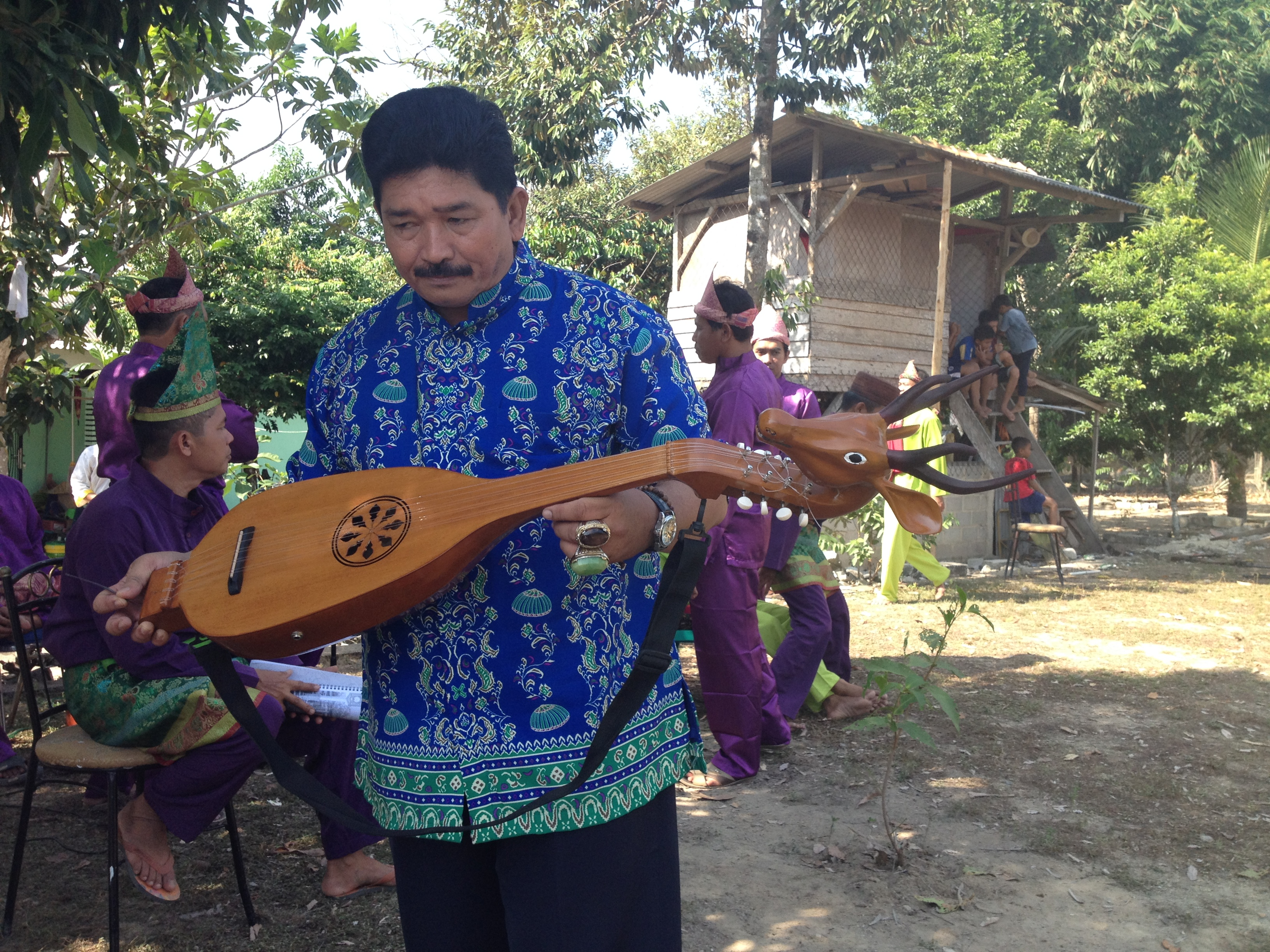
An Indonesian man holding a dambus, a related instrument that always has a wooden soundboard and often a carved deer on the end of the pegbox in Indonesia.

Some modern luthiers in Indonesia and other countries have begun to make hybrid instruments, combining the gambus or dambus (?) with other instruments, such as the ud (Sabah), the Hawaiian ukulele (Flores) or the bluegrass mandoline (Lombok). The pronunciation dambus is met in Bangka Belitung Islands and also in a limited area from Sukamara Regency and Pangkalan Bun (Central Kalimantan). Elsewhere in Indonesia, some other well known corruptions are gambusu and gambusi, respectively observed in Sulawesi and Gorontalo. In Lombok, the mandoline-shaped gambus - actually a vague, fretless copy of Gibson's A-type bluegrass mandoline - is also locally named manolin which used to accompany Kemidi Rudat plays or kecimol entertainment.

=== Gambus Melayu or gambus Hijaz ===
The gambus Melayu –also known as gambus Hijaz ("Hijazi gambus"), panting, gita nangka, gambus seludang ("palm spathe gambus"), gambus perahu ("perahu gambus"), and gambus biawak – retains a shape similar to the original qanbūs, but equipped with a skin soundboard. The sounds of this gambus accommodate to native Malay music more than its more conservative Hadhramaut counterpart.

Tuning:

Riau Islands: G_{3} D_{4}D_{4} G_{4}G_{4} C_{5}C_{5} for wire strings or A_{3} D_{4}D_{4} G_{4}G_{4} C_{5}C_{5} for nylon strings
Eastern Sumatra: G AA B DD AA EE (double courses tuned in unison)
elsewhere in Indonesia and Malay Peninsula: A_{3} D_{4}D_{4} G_{4}G_{4} C_{5}C_{5}
Brunei: E_{3}E_{3} A_{3}A_{3} D_{4}D_{4} or DD GG CC

=== Gambus Hadhramaut ===
The gambus Hadhramaut is a gambus that resembles an oud. The name Hadhramaut refers to Eastern Yemen, and this form of the instrument may have arrived in Indonesia (and a wider extent to another Malay world countries) with immigrants from there in the 19th century, joining Muslim communities already established centuries earlier. The bowl is made of light woods, the neck of a hardwood. It has a wooden soundboard. It is a fretless instrument with 11 strings in 6 courses, tuned low note to high:

(Notes in scientific pitch notation)
Arab tuning for oud: C_{2} F_{2}F_{2} A_{2}A_{2} D_{3}D_{3} G_{3}G_{3} C_{4}C_{4}
Alternate for oud C EE AA DD GG CC
Circle of fifths: B_{2} E_{3}E_{3} A_{3}A_{3} D_{4}D_{4} G_{4}G_{4} C_{5}C_{5}
Circle of fifths: B EE AA DD GG BB
Ghazal: A, DD, GG, CC, FF, BbBb

=== Gambus Seludang ===
The Gambus Seludang was another name for the gambus Hijaz with a specific reference to its monoxyle (like boat constructed from a single piece of timber) structure. The name came with the revival in Brunei, Riau and Sabah. In Sabah, this is similar in shape and size to the gambus Hijaz, but features a wooden resonator.

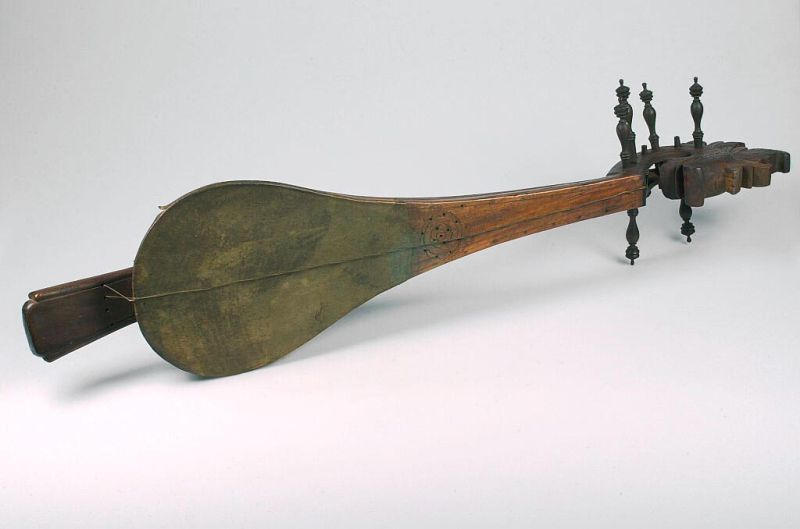
c. 1871, an ancient gambus originated from Indonesia.

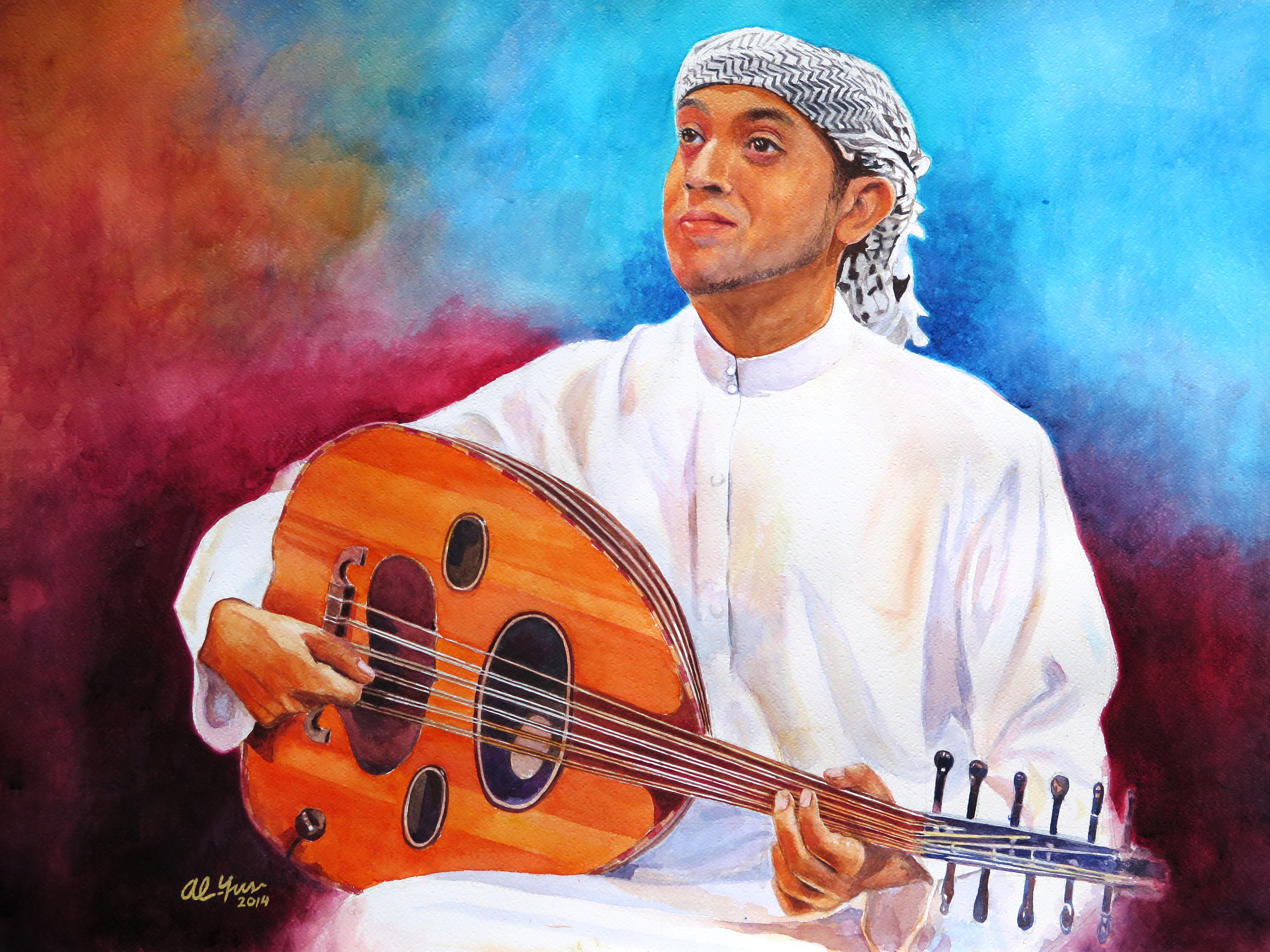
2014. Gambus Hadhramaut.

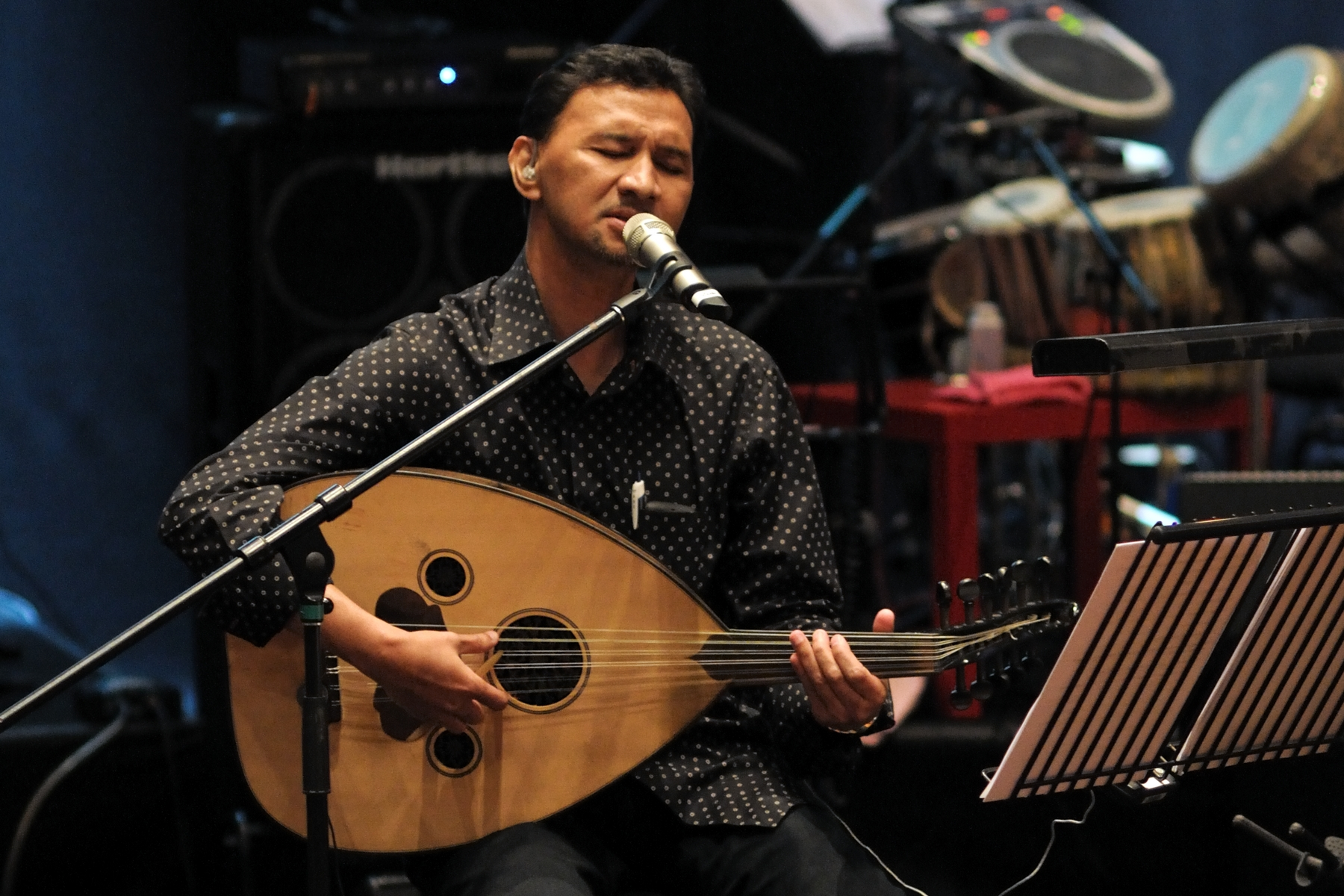
2010, Malaysia. Musician playing gambus Hadhramaut.

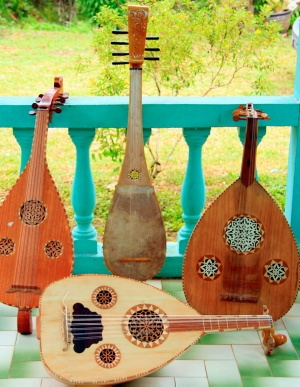
Myanmar. (top row from left): Gambus (or Indonesian: saludang bunta), gambus Melayu, gambus Hadhramaut and gambus Hadhramaut (bottom).

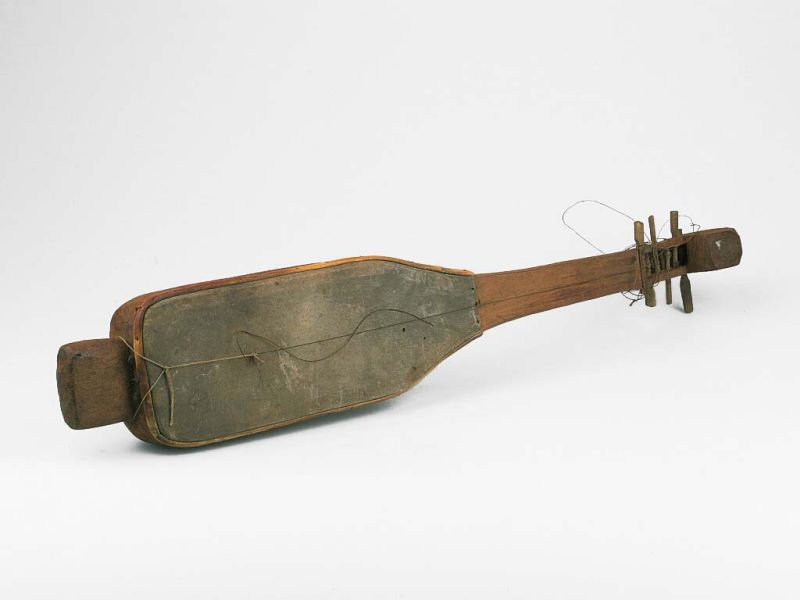
c. 1939 in Lombok, Indonesia. Penting. "Panting" is another word for the gambus Melayu in South Kalimantan, Indonesia.

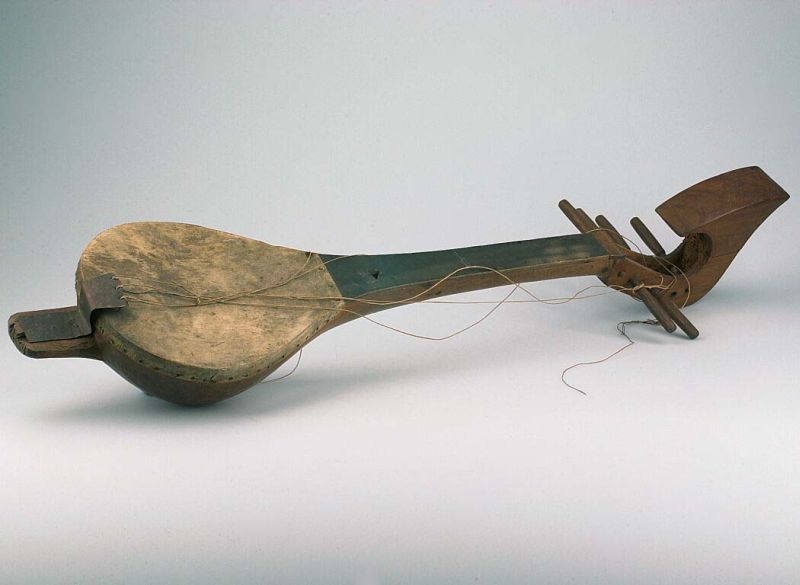
c. 1936 in Halmahera, Indonesia. Gambus originated from Indonesia as the Tropenmuseum collection, Netherlands.

== Similar instruments ==
- Gittern – a medieval European instrument built in the same way, but with a completely wooden soundboard.

== See also ==
- Mirwas
- Zapin
- Oud
- Barbat
