= Zaffa =

Arab wedding march

In Arab culture, the zaffa (Arabic: زفـّـة / ALA-LC: zaffah), or wedding march, is a musical procession with regional and cultural variety. When the procession reaches its destination, there is usually a party, more loud noises, and then dinner.

== By region ==
Zaffah is commonly held as a traditional and celebratory wedding procession in cultures throughout the Arab world, including the Levant such as in Lebanon, Palestine and Syria, whereby it symbolizes the start of the wedding festivities. It is a lively and vibrant event that involves music, dancing, and cultural rituals.

=== Egypt ===
The Zaffa is also well-documented in many Egyptian movies ever since their start more than a hundred years ago, which massively helped spread the ancient Egyptian tradition to the whole region. An Egyptian zaffa may involve bendir drums, bagpipes, horns, belly dancers and men carrying flaming swords.

=== Palestine (region) ===
Outside of a wedding context, Palestinian Christians perform a variety of zaffeh during Easter.

ِA zaffa for a wedding may incorporate religious aspects such as religious chants.
