= List of incumbent regional heads and deputy regional heads in Riau =

The following is an article about the list of Regional Heads and Deputy Regional Heads in 12 regencies/cities in Riau who are currently still serving.

== List ==
Regency/ City	Photo of the Regent/ Mayor	Regent/ Mayor	Photo of Deputy Regent/ Mayor	Deputy Regent/ Mayor	Taking Office	End of Office (Planned)	Ref.
Bengkalis; Regency List of Regents/Deputy Regents		Kasmarni		Bagus Santoso	20 February 2025	20 February 2030	
Indragiri Hilir; Regency List of Regents/Deputy Regents		Herman		Yuliantini	20 February 2025	20 February 2030	
Indragiri Hulu; Regency List of Regents/Deputy Regents		Ade Agus Hartanto		Hendrizal	20 February 2025	20 February 2030	
Kampar; Regency List of Regents/Deputy Regents		Ahmad Yuzar		Misharti	20 February 2025	20 February 2030	
Meranti Islands; Regency List of Regents/Deputy Regents		Asmar		Muzamil Baharudin	20 February 2025	20 February 2030	
Kuantan Singingi; Regency List of Regents/Deputy Regents		Suhardiman Amby		Muklisin	20 February 2025	20 February 2030	
Pelalawan; Regency List of Regents/Deputy Regents		Zukri		Husni Tamrin	20 February 2025	20 February 2030	
Rokan Hilir; Regency List of Regents/Deputy Regents		Bistamam		Jhony Charles	20 February 2025	20 February 2030	
Rokan Hulu; Regency List of Regents/Deputy Regents		Anton		Syafaruddin Poti	20 February 2025	20 February 2030	
Siak; Regency List of Regents/Deputy Regents		Afni Zulkifli		Syamsurizal	4 June 2025	4 June 2030	
Dumai; City List of Mayors/Deputy mayors		Paisal		Sugiyarto	20 February 2025	20 February 2030	
Pekanbaru; City List of Mayors/Deputy mayors		Agung Nugroho		Markarius Anwar	20 February 2025	20 February 2030	

Notes

- "Commencement of office" is the inauguration date at the beginning or during the current term of office. For acting regents/mayors, it is the date of appointment or extension as acting regent/mayor.
- Based on the Constitutional Court decision Number 27/PUU-XXII/2024, the Governor and Deputy Governor, Regent and Deputy Regent, and Mayor and Deputy Mayor elected in 2020 shall serve until the inauguration of the Governor and Deputy Governor, Regent and Deputy Regent, and Mayor and Deputy Mayor elected in the 2024 national simultaneous elections as long as the term of office does not exceed 5 (five) years.

== See also ==
- Riau
