= Selat Panjang =

- Town

Other transcription(s)
  - Jawi: سلات ڤنجڠ
  - Chinese: 石叻班讓
  - Peh-oe-ji: siā la̍t pan jiāng
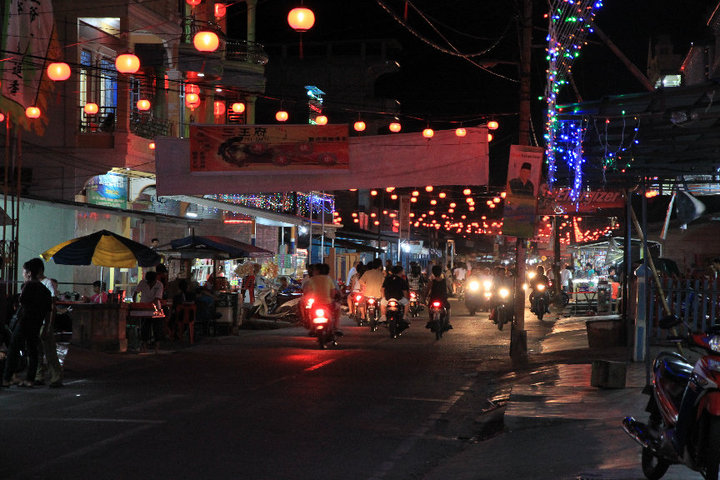
- Night streetview of Selat Panjang
- Interactive map of Selat Panjang
- Country: Indonesia
- Province: Riau

Area
  - Total: 89.38 km^{2} (34.51 sq mi)

Population (mid 2023 estimate)
  - Total: 66,400
  - Density: 743/km^{2} (1,920/sq mi)
- Time zone: UTC+7 (WIB)
  - Summer (DST): Not observed

Selat Panjang
- Traditional Chinese: 石叻班讓
- Simplified Chinese: 石叻班让
Transcriptions
Standard Mandarin
- Hanyu Pinyin: Shílèbānràng
Hakka
- Romanization: sa̍k le̍t pân ngiong
Yue: Cantonese
- Jyutping: daam3 lak6 baan1 joeng6
Southern Min
- Hokkien POJ: chio̍h lak pan niū

Selat Panjang (Jawi: سلات ڤنجڠ; Chinese: 石叻班讓; pinyin: shílèbānràng) is the capital of Kepulauan Meranti Regency, which is part of the province of Riau in Indonesia. The regency is a new regency in Riau province which was established on 19 December 2008 after being separated from Bengkalis Regency. The city is located on Tebing Tinggi Island, which is separated by a narrow channel from Sumatra, and across the Strait of Malacca from Singapore.

== People ==
The town of Selat Panjang (administratively, the district or kecamatan of Tebing Tinggi) has a dense population of about 66,400 people in mid-2023. The largest ethnic group is Chinese, and almost all of them adhere to Buddhism and Taoism. Around 37% of the population is ethnically Malay. There are also smaller ethnic groups such as Tamils, Minangkabau, and Javanese.

Thus, nowadays many Chinese Indonesians who are originally from Selat Panjang have moved to other regions to make a better living at prominent locations like Singapore, Medan, Pekanbaru, Batam, Bengkalis, and Tanjung Balai Karimun. Nevertheless, during every Chinese New Year, many of them would return to Selat Panjang to celebrate the Chinese New Year with their kin and relatives although they have migrated to other regions or cities for many years.

== Language ==
Bahasa Indonesia is primarily spoken by people in Selatpanjang. Besides that, Riau Malay is used as a lingua franca while the local Chinese population speaks a form of Hokkien language known as Riau Hokkien (廖内福建话). This form of Hokkien is very similar to Singaporean Hokkien and Southern Malaysian Hokkien in terms of accent as well as lexicon. Riau Hokkien is spoken in the middle and southern part of the Indonesian island of Sumatra and is very different from Medan Hokkien which is used in the northern part of the Sumatra island.

== Climate & Environment ==
Located near to the equator, temperatures vary little during the year, typically with a high of 31 °C (88 °F) and low of 22 °C (72 °F) in each month. Rainfall ranges from 109 millimetres (4.3 in) in July to 289 millimetres (11.4 in) in November, totalling about 2,400 millimetres (94 in) per year. The land is flat. At one time it was entirely covered by peat swamps and dense forest, but it is rapidly being cleared for pulpwood and palm oil plantations. Mudskippers thrive in the tidal flats. Lake Nambus is about 30 minutes by road from the port of Selat Panjang, near Tanjung Village, surrounded by protected forest. During the month of Safar local people swim in the lake.

Climate data for Selat Panjang
Month	Jan	Feb	Mar	Apr	May	Jun	Jul	Aug	Sep	Oct	Nov	Dec	Year
Mean daily maximum °C (°F)	30.9 (87.6)	31.4 (88.5)	31.9 (89.4)	31.9 (89.4)	32.1 (89.8)	31.8 (89.2)	31.6 (88.9)	31.4 (88.5)	31.6 (88.9)	31.7 (89.1)	31.2 (88.2)	31.1 (88.0)	31.6 (88.8)
Daily mean °C (°F)	26.3 (79.3)	26.6 (79.9)	27.1 (80.8)	27.2 (81.0)	27.3 (81.1)	27.1 (80.8)	26.8 (80.2)	26.7 (80.1)	26.9 (80.4)	26.9 (80.4)	26.6 (79.9)	26.5 (79.7)	26.8 (80.3)
Mean daily minimum °C (°F)	21.7 (71.1)	21.9 (71.4)	22.3 (72.1)	22.5 (72.5)	22.6 (72.7)	22.4 (72.3)	22.1 (71.8)	22.0 (71.6)	22.2 (72.0)	22.1 (71.8)	22.0 (71.6)	21.9 (71.4)	22.1 (71.9)
Average rainfall mm (inches)	205 (8.1)	124 (4.9)	204 (8.0)	228 (9.0)	184 (7.2)	135 (5.3)	109 (4.3)	165 (6.5)	191 (7.5)	259 (10.2)	289 (11.4)	248 (9.8)	2,341 (92.2)
Source: Climate-Data.org

== History of the town ==
The town of Selat Panjang is the administrative seat of the Meranti Islands Regency. It used to be one of the cities (Bandar) that were the busiest and most popular trading centres in the Sultanate of Siak. The town has formed a heterogeneous society, especially of the Malays and Chinese because they are the role of inter- formed closely in harmony with cultural activities and trade. All this is inseparable tolerance inter-fraternity. It is this factor which then fosters trade and traffic as well as human goods from China to the archipelago and vice versa.

Selat Panjang and the surrounding area were formerly a territory of the Sultanate of Siak Sri Indrapura which is one of the largest empires in Riau during the reign of Sultan Siak VII of Sultan Sharif Ali Abdul Jalil Assyaidis Syaifuddin Baalawi (who reigned in 1784-1810), usually called Sultan Sharif Ali, gave command to the Commander of Tengku Muda Good Saiyid Thoha to establish the State or the dealer at the Tebing Tinggi Island. In addition to interest in the island as well as Sultan Sharif Ali Abdul Jalil Assyaidis Syaifuddin Baalawi himself had to stop in the area, the main purpose of Sultan Sharif Ali was to gather forces against the kingdom of Sambas (West Kalimantan), which indicated that allied with the Dutch, who had betrayed the agreement faithfully and steal the crown Siak kingdom. Country or Bandar as it will spearhead the third defense after the Bukit Batu and Merbauto confront the invaders and pirates.

Then the fleet under the Command of Commander in Chief Tengku Muda Saiyid Thoha at the beginning of Muharram in 1805 AD Kingdom of Siak accompanied by some authorities, hundreds of soldiers, and Balang upstream toward the island of High Cliff. They arrived at the cliff of Forest Alai (now the Capital District of West Tebingtinggi). Commander immediately stabs Keris and greets Alai. Ground Alai Land did not answer, he scooped up a handful of land, which was hot. He took it off, "According to all the knowledge den, the soil is not good Alai made a country because of land Forest land Alai is a male, could develop into a new country in a period," said the commander in front of a magnifying Siak and his men.

Commander of the departed along the coast of this island. Then, it looks like a high cliff. "This is the hell is meant by the father of Sultan Sharif Ali," he thought. Fleet docked to Cliff High Land coincided a date April 7, 1805 AD. At the age was 25 years, with say Bismillah Commander soared into the high ground while greeting. "Alhamdulillah high ground is answering greetings den," he said. Land on taking it feels cool and comfortable. He plugs in the dagger on the ground (roughly its current location near the office complex Selatpanjang Customs). As I said, "Hear ye the land by the Forest High Cliff is a very well-established country. This country will develop safe and prosperous when leaders and citizens fairly work hard and obey the laws of God. "

The commander was standing in front of all the royal princes, soldiers, upstream Balang, and inner-inner around the island. "Den Bagus Saiyid Thoha named Tengku Panglima Besar Muda Siak Sri Indrapura. Kris Den is named Lightning Open Sunscreen Natural State. This figure den Affairs Makmur Kencana Bandar called the High Cliff. "Origin of the town's name Selatpanjang.

After the cutting of forests, and open areas of power stood the palace of the great commander. In 1810 AD Sultan Sharif Ali Muda Tengku Panglima Besar Saiyid Thoha was ruler of the island. At that time, the east of the country bordered the River Suir, and the west was bordered by the River Perumbi, as development time is increasingly crowded airports and grew as a commercial port in the empire siak.

Bustling trade interaction of coastal areas of Riau is the reason for the Dutch East Indies government participated in the determination of the name of this country. History was recorded during the 11th Sultan of Siak Sultan Hashim Abdul Jalil Assayaidis Syarief Syaifuddin. In 1880, the government in the High Cliff State Makmur Kencana was dominated by JM Tengkoe Soelong Tjantik Saijet Alwi who holds a Master Tomonggong Marhum Tail (Head of State who is responsible to the Sultan of Siak). During his reign at this airport there was a polemic with the Dutch Colonial Government Konteliur Van Huis about changing the name of this country, in the Dutch colonial government unilaterally changed the area into Selat Panjang, but not approved by JM Tengkoe Soelong Tjantik Saijet Alwi as local stakeholders. Finally, based on mutual agreement on September 4, 1899, High Cliff State Kencana Makmur Airport turned into State Tebingtinggi Selatpanjang.JM Tengkoe Soelong Tjantik Saijet Alwi died in 1908. Over time the beginning of the Government of the Republic of Indonesia, Selat Panjang town, and the surrounding area became under Bengkalis Regency Kewedanan which then changed status to Tebing Tinggi. Pada District dated December 19, 2008, Selat Panjang and the surrounding area was turned into Meranti Islands Regency which was split away from the Bengkalis Regency with its capital at Selat Panjang.

== Economy ==
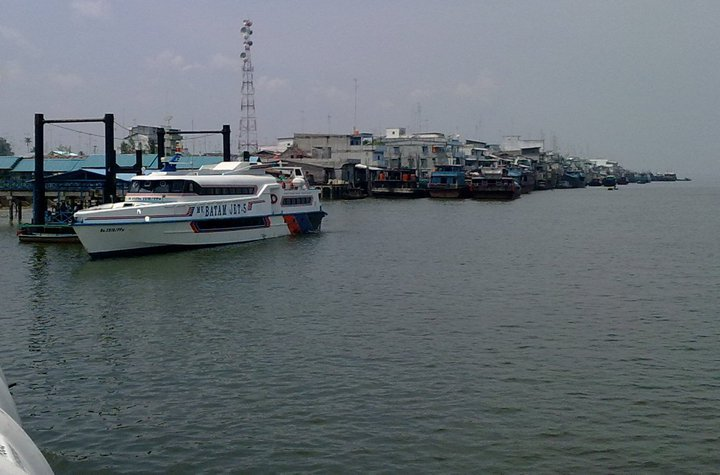
The port of Selat Panjang

The town's main activities are fishing, agriculture, timber and retail. Selat Panjang has a small port with limited capacity. Electricity supply is not yet optimal. The people of the area are largely dependent on water transport, still often using dugouts to get around. However, both oil and natural gas have been found in Tebing Tinggi and the neighboring Padang and Merbau Islands. The TA field is close to Selat Panjang. New sago plantings were started in the region on peat soils in 1989, with US$2 million per year expected to be invested in the crop.

== Hotels ==
Star Hotels in Selat Panjang, among others:

Names of Hotel	Classification
Grand Indobaru Hotel Selat Panjang	★★★★
Grand Meranti Hotel Selat Panjang	★★★
Trio Jaya Hotel	★★★
Selat Panjang Hotel	★★
New Cheh Kong Wisma	★

== Tourism ==
- Cultural attractions in Selatpanjang

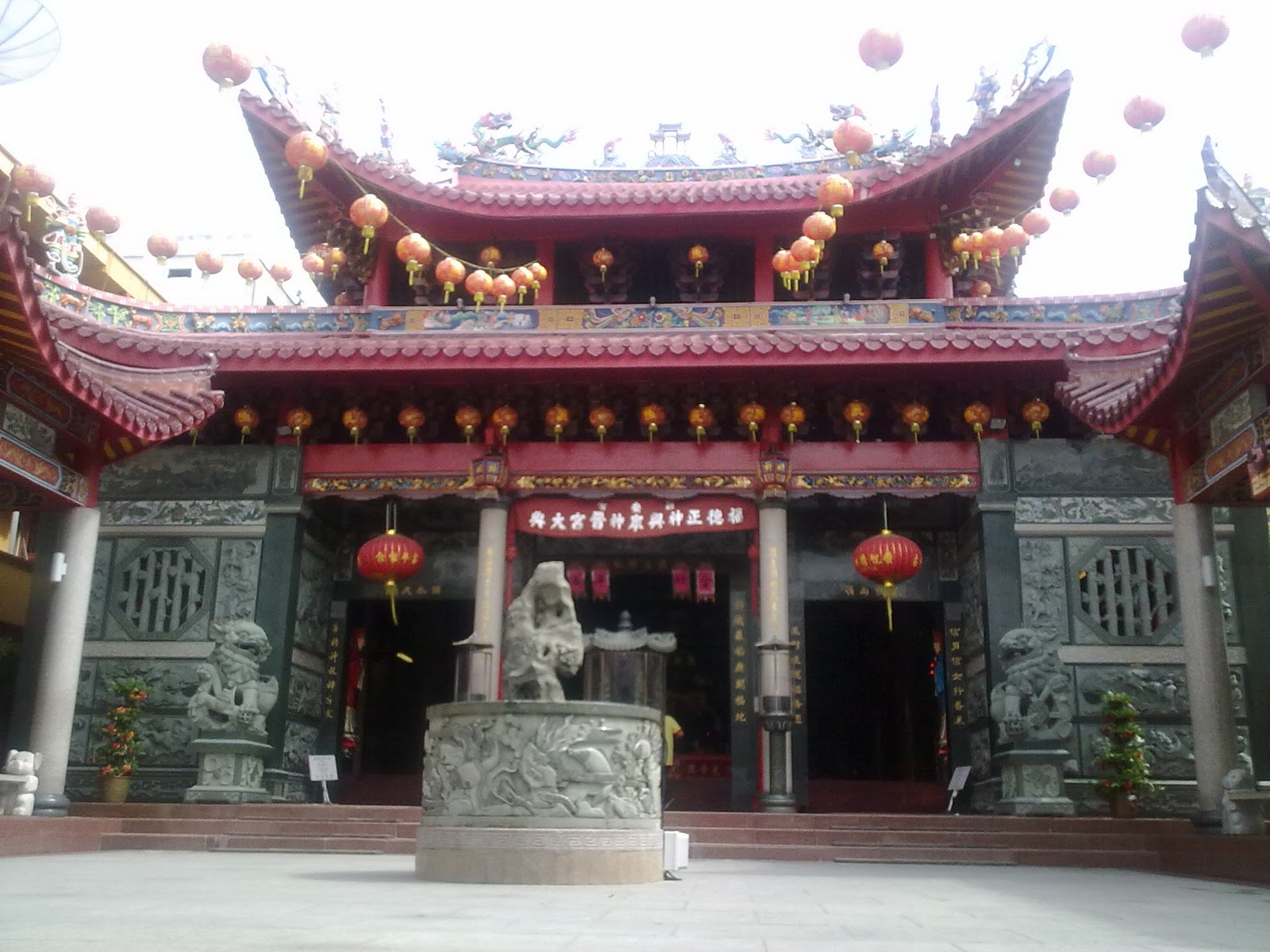
Vihara Sejahtera Sakti Selatpanjang

- Hoo Ann Kiong Temple (護安宮)

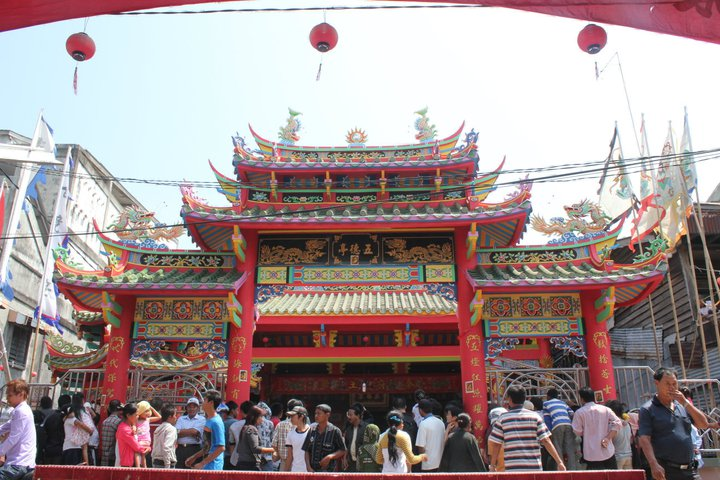
Gapura Chinese Temple at Sungai Juling, Selat Panjang

== Sister Cities ==
Sister Cities	Country
Bagan	Myanmar
Koh Samui	Thailand
Jasin	Malaysia
