= Bengkalis =

Bengkalis may refer to:

- Bengkalis Island an island in the Strait of Malacca, Riau, Indonesia.
- Bengkalis Regency, a regency in Riau province, Indonesia. It comprises Bengkalis Island, Rupat Island, and a part of Sumatra mainland.
- Bengkalis, Bengkalis, a district in Bengkalis Regency.
- Bengkalis Kota, a town in Bengkalis District.
