= Iyeth Bustami =

Indonesian singer and politician (born 1973)

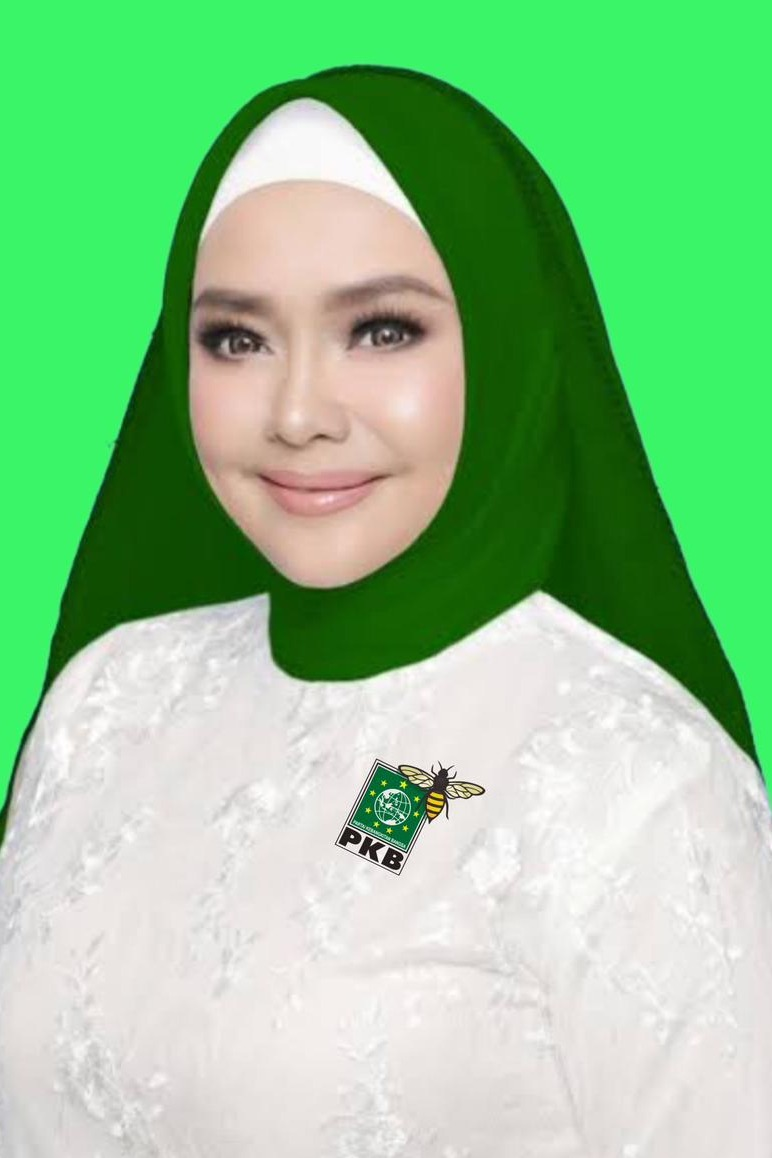
- Official portrait, 2023

Member of House of Representatives
- Incumbent
- Assumed office 1 October 2024

Personal details
- Born: Sri Barat; 24 August 1973 (age 52) Bengkalis Regency, Riau, Indonesia
- Party: National Awakening Party
- Spouse: Eka Sapta Nugraha (m. 2004)
- Children: 3
- Occupation: Singer; politician; actress
- Musical career
- Genres: Dangdut; Pop melayu; Traditional folk music
- Labels: HP Record; Musica Studios

Iyeth Bustami (born Sri Barat; 24 August 1973) is an Indonesian dangdut singer, actress, and politician currently serving as a member of the House of Representatives representing Riau since 2024. She rose to fame after releasing the single "Laksamana Raja di Laut" (2003), which earned her the nickname "Queen of Indonesian Malay Dangdut".

== Life and career ==
=== Early life (1973–1990) ===
Bustami, born Sri Barat on 24 August 1973 in Bengkalis, a city in Bengkalis Regency, Riau, was the sixth child and youngest daughter of the six children of Nagats, a former junior school teacher, and Adam Bustami, a retired civil servant. She had four brothers, Ipan, Tajul Qori, Butet, and Ayang, and a sister, Susi. During her youth, Bustami spent her time listening to music and working as a singer at cafes.

=== Early career (1990–2003) ===
Bustami began her career as a singer in 1990. She moved to Jakarta and signed a contract with a JK Record before releasing her debut album, Dondang Sayang. Bustami later released her next album Rumah Cinta, collaborating with Eddy Lestahulu and Alik Ababiel. She then released a few albums, such as Emangnya Aku Pikirin (1992), Cik Minah Sayang, and Cinta Hanya Sekali (both 2000). Bustami's album focused on adapting Malay music themes from the 1940s until the 1960s.

=== Breakthrough with Laksamana Raja di Laut ===
In 2003, Bustami released a single titled "Laksamana Raja di Laut" which gained her critical acclaim. She won a Best Female Dangdut Singer at TPI Dangdut Award in the same year and was referred as Queen of Malay and Indonesian Dangdut. Bustami won two additional awards for Best Conventional Dangdut Song Arrangement and Best Video Clip.

Bustami's success caused a controversy between her and singer Nurham Yahya, who claimed to be the creator of the song. Yahya sued Bustami for Rp. 3 billion and later withdrew his demands after Bustami revealed the actual creator of the song, a Malaysian composer, the late Datuk "Pak Ngah" Suhaimi Mohd. Zain.

=== 2004–present: Marriage and political career ===
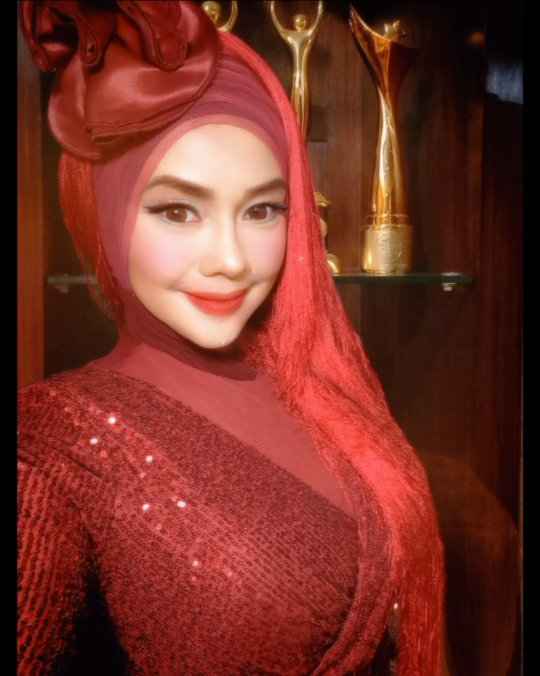
Bustami in 2023

In 2004, Bustami married Eka Sapta in a private ceremony and later held a reception in Denpasar, Bali, on 6 April 2004. They had three daughters: Zaviena Bintang, Maoula Loviyeka, and Kayra Safwah Nugraha.

In 2014, Bustami started her political career by joining National Awakening Party and participated in the election of legislative candidates representing Riau, but failed.

In 2020, Bustami ran in the Bengkalis Regency regional elections as a candidate for deputy regent, accompanied by Kaderismanto from the Indonesian Democratic Party of Struggle party. They lost against Kasmarni and earned 50,570 votes or 18 percent of total votes.

On 29 August 2023, Bustami released DVD version of Diva Dangdut Karaoke album, a collaboration between her and famous Indonesian dangdut diva, such as Elvy Sukaesih, Rita Sugiarto, and Iis Dahlia.

In 2024, Bustami ran for election of members of House of Representatives against two former Governor of Riau, Syamsuar and Arsyadjuliandi Rachman, representing Riau and earned 23,710 votes.

== Discography ==
Album	Year	Production	Notes
Dondang Sayang	1990	—N/a	
Cup-Cup Trio Dangdut	1991	—N/a	
Memangnya Aku Pikirin	1992	SKI Record	
Cik Minah Sayang	1994	JK Records	
Rumah Cinta	1994	JK Records	
Pop Minang '95	1995	JK Records	
Lancang Kuning	1995	—N/a	
Pamadeh Labuah	1997	FAN Production	
Krisis Cinta	1998	—N/a	
Pop Minang Special	2000	Gita Varma	
Cinta Hanya Sekali	2000	Maheswara Musik Records	
Zapin-Dut: Laksmana Raja di Laut	2003	MGM Records	
Mini Album Iyeth Bustami	2008	IB Music	
D'Duta	2010	Nagaswara	
Best of The Best Iyeth Bustami	2012	Sandi Records	
Best of Iyeth Bustami	2016	IB Music	
Symphony Tembang Melayu	2018	Irama 7 Nada	

== Awards and nominations ==
Year	Award	Category	Nomination	Result
2000	Anugerah Dangdut	Penyanyi Rekaman Lagu Dangdut Wanita Terbaik	Iyeth Bustami – Cinta Hanya Sekali	Nominated
2003	Anugerah Dangdut	Penyanyi Rekaman Lagu Dangdut Wanita Terbaik	Iyeth Bustami – Zapin-Dut: Laksmana Raja di Laut	Won
2003	Anugerah Dangdut	Video Klip Dangdut Terbaik	Iyeth Bustami – Laksmana Raja di Laut (Sutradara: Rizal Mantovani)	Won
2003	MTV Indonesia Awards	Best Dangdut	Iyeth Bustami – Laksmana Raja di Laut	Won
2003	Anugerah Musik Indonesia	Artis Solo Wanita Dangdut Terbaik	Iyeth Bustami – Laksmana Raja di Laut	Nominated
2011	Anugerah Musik Indonesia	Karya Produksi Dangdut Melayu Terbaik	D'Jingga (Iyeth Bustami feat. Erie Suzan) – Sabda Cinta	Nominated
2011	Anugerah Musik Indonesia	Karya Produksi Dangdut Melayu Terbaik	Iyeth Bustami – Sudahlah	Nominated
2015	Anugerah Dangdut Indonesia	Penyanyi Dangdut Original Terbaik	Iyeth Bustami – Suamiku	Won
2016	Anugerah Musik Indonesia	Penyanyi Solo Pria/Wanita Dangdut Terbaik	Iyeth Bustami – Suamiku	Won
2018	Anugerah Musik Indonesia	Pencipta Lagu Dangdut/Dangdut Kontemporer Terbaik	Iyeth Bustami – "Doa Ku" (dinyanyikan oleh Putri Isnari)	Nominated
2018	Anugerah Dangdut Indonesia	Lagu Dangdut Terbaik	Iyeth Bustami – Doaku	Won
2021	Anugerah Musik Indonesia	Artis Solo Pria/Wanita Dangdut Kontemporer Terbaik	Iyeth Bustami – "Satu Jiwa Satu Nyawa"	Won
