= Mayor of Pekanbaru =

- Wali Kota Pekanbaru
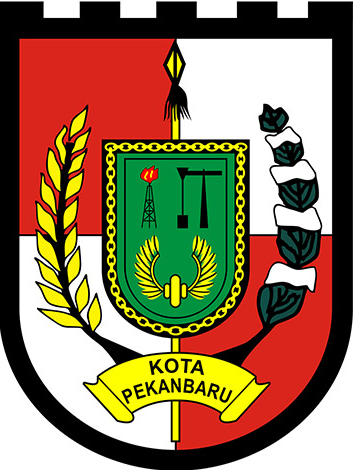
- Coat of arms of Pekanbaru

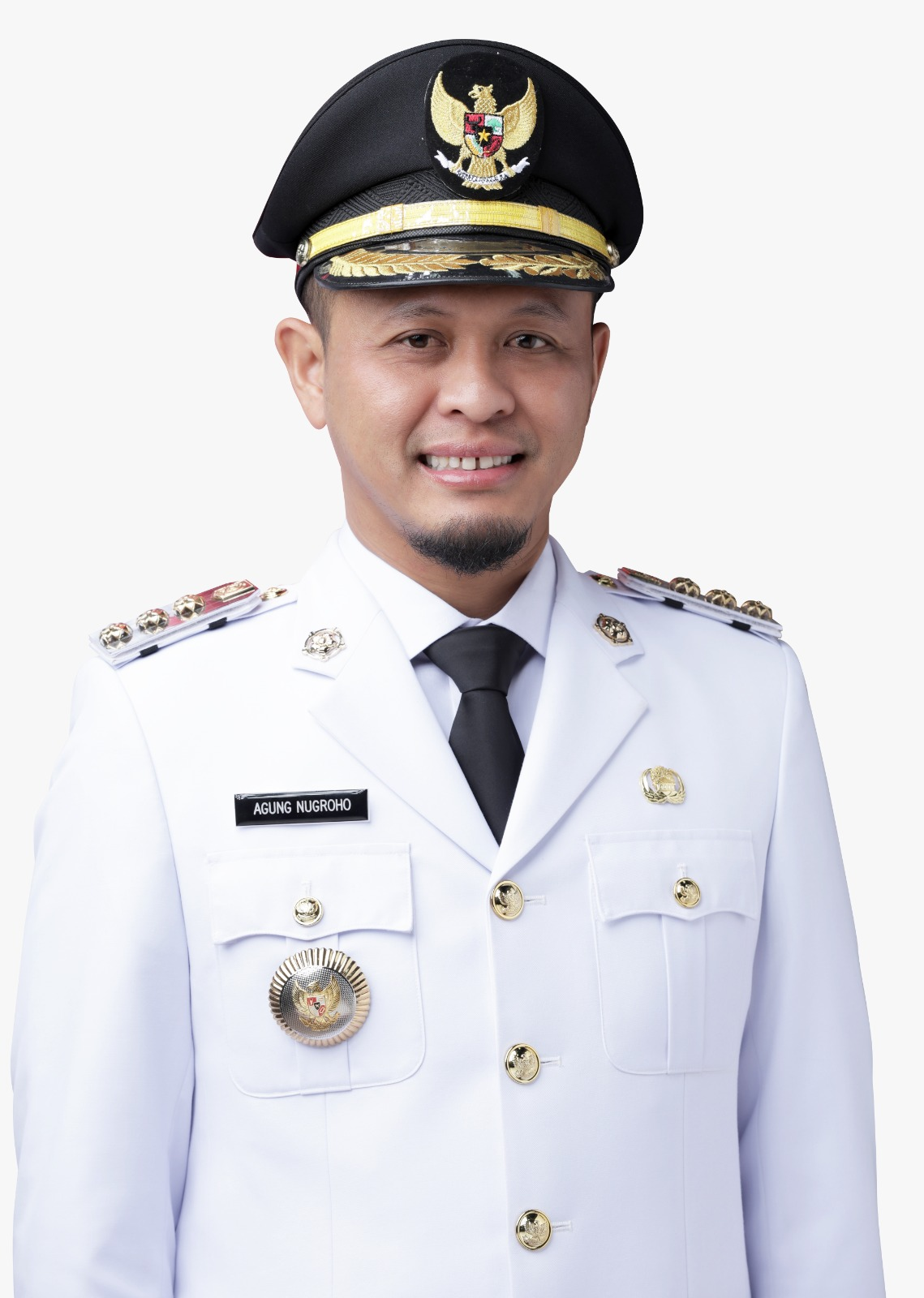
- Incumbent; Agung Nugroho since 20 February 2025
- Term length: 5 years
- Inaugural holder: Datuk Wan Abdul Rahman
- Formation: 17 May 1946
- Website: www.pekanbaru.go.id

Mayor of Pekanbaru is the head of the second-level region who holds the government in Pekanbaru together with the vice mayor and 50 members of the Pekanbaru City Regional House of Representatives. The mayor and vice mayor of Pekanbaru are elected through general elections held every 5 years. The first mayor of Pekanbaru was Datuk Wan Abdul Rahman, who governed the city period from 1946 to 1950.

== List ==
The following is a list of the names of the mayors of Pekanbaru from time to time.

Mayor of Pekanbaru
Num.	Portrait	Mayor	Beginning of office	End of Term	Political Party / Faction	Period	Note.	Vice mayor
1		Datuk Wan Abdul Rahman	17 May 1946	11 November 1950	Independent	1		N/A
2		Datuk Ahmad	11 November 1950	7 May 1953	Independent	2		N/A
3		Tengku Ilyas	7 May 1953	1 June 1956	Independent	3		N/A
4		Muhammad Yunus	1 June 1956	14 May 1958	Independent	4		N/A
5		Orang Kaya Muhammad Jamil	14 May 1958	9 November 1959	Independent	5		N/A
(1)		Datuk Wan Abdul Rahman	9 November 1959	29 March 1962	Independent	6		N/A
6		Tengku Bay	29 March 1962	1 June 1968	Islamic Education Movement	7		N/A
7		Radja Roesli	1 June 1968	10 December 1970	Independent	8		N/A
8		Abdul Rahman Hamid	10 December 1970	10 December 1975	Independent	9		N/A
8		Abdul Rahman Hamid	10 December 1975	5 July 1981	Independent	10		N/A
9		Ibrahim Arsyad	5 July 1981	21 July 1986	Independent	11		N/A
10		Farouq Alwi	21 July 1986	22 July 1991	Independent	12		N/A
11		Oesman Effendi Apan	22 July 1991	18 July 1996	Independent	13		N/A
11		Oesman Effendi Apan	18 July 1996	18 July 2001	Independent	14		N/A
12		Herman Abdullah	18 July 2001	17 July 2006	Golkar	15 (2001)		Erwandi Saleh (2003–2006)
12		Herman Abdullah	17 July 2006	18 July 2011	Golkar	16 (2006)		Erizal Muluk
13		Firdaus	26 January 2012	27 October 2016	Demokrat	17 (2011)		Ayat Cahyadi
13		Firdaus	22 May 2017	22 May 2022	Demokrat	18 (2017)		Ayat Cahyadi
14		Agung Nugroho	20 February 2025	Incumbent	Demokrat	19 (2024)		Markarius Anwar

== Temporary replacement ==
In the government stack, a regional head who submits himself to leave or temporarily resigns from his position to the central government, then the minister of home affairs prepares a replacement who is a bureaucrat in the regional government or even a vice mayor, including when the mayor's position is in a transition period.

Portrait	Mayor	Party	Beginning	End	Duration	Period	Definitive	Ref.
	Syamsurizal (Acting)	Independent	18 July 2011	25 January 2012	191 days	—	Transition	
	Edwar Sanger (Acting Officer)	Independent	27 October 2016	26 January 2017	91 days	17 (2011)	Firdaus	
	Edwar Sanger (Acting)	Independent	26 January 2017	22 May 2017	116 days	—	Transition	
	Muflihun (Acting)	Independent	23 May 2022	22 May 2023	364 days	—	Transition	
	Muflihun (Acting)	Independent	23 May 2023	22 May 2024	365 days	—	Transition	
	Risnandar Mahiwa (Acting)	Independent	22 May 2024	2 December 2024	194 days	—	Transition	
	Roni Rakhmat (Acting)	Independent	3 December 2024	20 February 2025	79 days	—	Transition	

== See also ==
- Pekanbaru
- List of incumbent regional heads and deputy regional heads in Riau
