= Rangsang =

Island in Riau, Indonesia

Coordinates: 1°01′N 102°56′E

Location of Rangsang in Riau Province

Rangsang is an island of the Meranti Islands Regency of Riau Province in the Strait of Malacca, Sumatra, Indonesia. Administratively, it consists of the three districts (kecamatan) of Rangsang, Rangsang Pesisir (Coastal Rangsang) and Rangsang Barat (West Rangsang); Rangsang District covers the eastern part of the island (including some smaller islands off its southeast end), while Rangsang Pesisir District covers the entire central part of the island.

The island had a population of 51,452 at the 2010 Census and 58,464 at the 2020 Census; the official estimate as at mid 2023 was 60,840. It is just north of Tebing Tinggi Island, about 24 kilometres (15 mi) south-west of Great Karimun island and 22 kilometres (14 mi) west of Kundur Island.

The island measures 988.79 square kilometres (381.77 sq mi) in area. An Indonesian Navy warship is named after the island (KRI Pulau Rangsang)
