= Tebing Tinggi Island =

Island in Riau, Indonesia

Coordinates: 0°54′N 102°44′E

Location of Tebing Tinggi in Riau Province

Tebing Tinggi Island (also Rantau) is an island off the north east coast of Riau Province, Sumatra, Indonesia, located in the Strait of Malacca. It is located in the Meranti Islands Regency, and is directly east of Padang Island and directly south of Rangsang Island. The area is 1,600.06 km^{2}.

The capital is Selat Panjang, with 66,385 inhabitants in mid 2023. Other population centers include Bengkikit, Merbau, Mengkudu, Sungaitohor and Mayau around the coast, and Deremi in the interior. The population of the island at the 2020 Census was 98,894; the official estimate as at mid 2023 was 100,011.
