= Kasmarni =

Indonesian politician (born 1974)

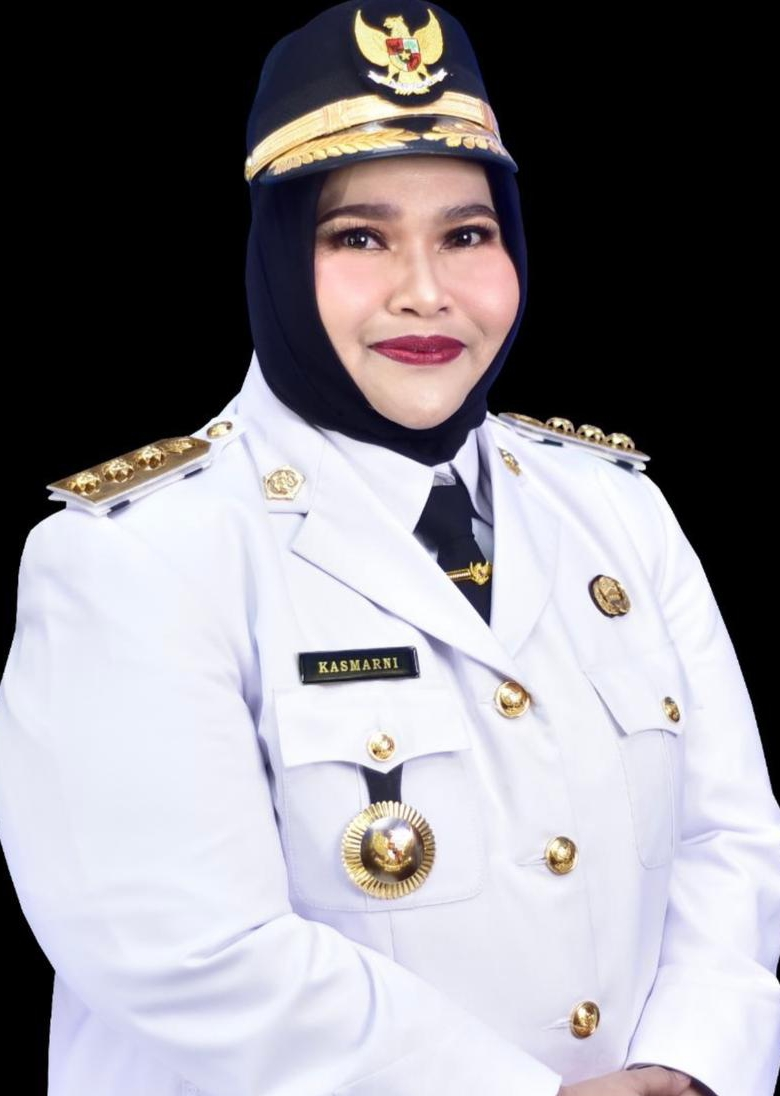

15th Regent of Bengkalis Regency
- Incumbent
- Assumed office 26 February 2021
- President: Joko Widodo; Prabowo Subianto
- Governor: Syamsuar; Edy Nasution; S.F. Hariyanto (acting); Rahman Hadi (acting)
- Deputy: Bagus Santoso
- Preceded by: Amril Mukminin

Personal details
- Born: 14 November 1974 (age 51) Pekanbaru, Riau, Indonesia
- Spouse: Amril Mukminin
- Children: 4
- Education: University of Riau; Surabaya Technology University
- Occupation: Politician

Kasmarni (born 14 November 1974) is an Indonesian politician who currently serves as 15th Regent of Bengkalis Regency from 26 February 2021 and became the first woman to hold the position.

== Early life ==
Kasmarni was born on 14 November 1974 in Pekanbaru, Riau. She started her junior school education at SDN 010 Pekanbaru and continued her middle school education at SMPN 15 Rumbai from 1987 until 1990. Kasmarni graduated from Setia Dharma high school after went there from 1990 until 1993 and later went to Faculty of Political Science at University of Riau majoring in sociology from 1993 until 2000, and earned her master's degree at Surabaya Technology University from 2010 until 2012.

== Personal life ==
Kasmarni is married to Amril Mukminin, a politician who formerly served as the 14th Regent of Bengkalis Regency, and has had four children.

== Career ==
Kasmarni started her career as Staff Employee of the General Bureau of the Riau Regional Secretary from 1999 until 2002 and as Bengkalis Regency Government Employee Staff from 2003 until 2006, and also served as various employee, such as Secretary of the Pinggir Subdistrict Head, Pinggir Subdistrict Head, Secretary of the Bengkalis Regency Manpower Office, Secretary of the Women's Empowerment and Child Protection Service, and Expert Staff of the Bengkalis Regent.

On 9 December 2020, Kasmarni won an election for Bengkalis Regent along with his candidate, Bagus Santoso, as Deputy Regent with 91,291 votes out of a total of 277,960 valid votes. They were appointed at Riau Governor office on 26 February 2021. During her first year term, Kasmarni successfully achieved the first best achievement in regional development of Riau in 2021. In the same year, she was also named the Head of the Regional Srikandi Sustainable Development at the Riau Province level. Kasmarni's leadership also succeeded in making Bengkalis a first-class child-friendly city from the Minister of Women's Empowerment and Child Protection. In addition, in the first year of her leadership, she launched the Bengkalis Sejahtera Card program, which was one of her and Santoso's political promises during the 2020 Pilkada campaign. In addition, Kasmarni also succeeded in building a lot of road infrastructure, especially the main roads connecting villages in Bengkalis Regency, which made the Lembaga Adat Melayu Riau (LAMR) give traditional titles to Kasmarni and his deputy Santoso, namely Datuk Seri Setia Amanah which is attached to her position, while the honorary title attached personally is Seri Perdana Payung Negeri, in December 2024.

On 6 February 2025, Kasmarni and Santoso was reelected after winning the 2024 Bengkalis Regional Election by obtaining 217,466 votes.

== Controversy ==
On 21 July 2020, a prosecutor for the Corruption Eradication Commission (KPK), in the indictment against the non-active Regent of Bengkalis, Amril Mukminin, alleged that Kasmarni had received Rp23.6 billion, purportedly from several businesspeople that was intended for Mukminin, which was deposited into her personal account. In response to this charge, Kasmarni finally spoke out through her husband’s legal counsel, Wirya Nata Atjmaja. She stated that her husband’s wealth was derived from business activities, rather than being mere handouts from others. Atjmaja noted that Mukminin has consistently submitted his State Official Wealth Report (LHKPN) to the KPK. He further remarked that it is common practice for a husband to conduct business using his wife’s bank account. "The funds are the result of business dealings and collaborations between Mr. Mukminin and several companies; therefore, they should not be linked to corruption or bribery," Atjmaja said. "It should also be emphasized that the business activities conducted by Amril Mukminin and these companies are entirely lawful," he asserted.
