= Meranti Islands Regency =

Regency in Riau, Indonesia

Coordinates: 1°0′N 102°42′E

Meranti Islands Regency Kabupaten Kepulauan Meranti
- Regency
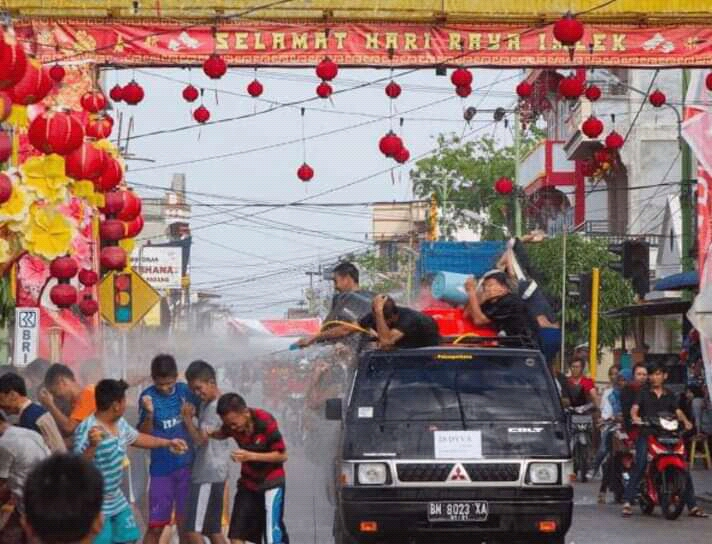
- Lunar New Year festival in Selat Panjang

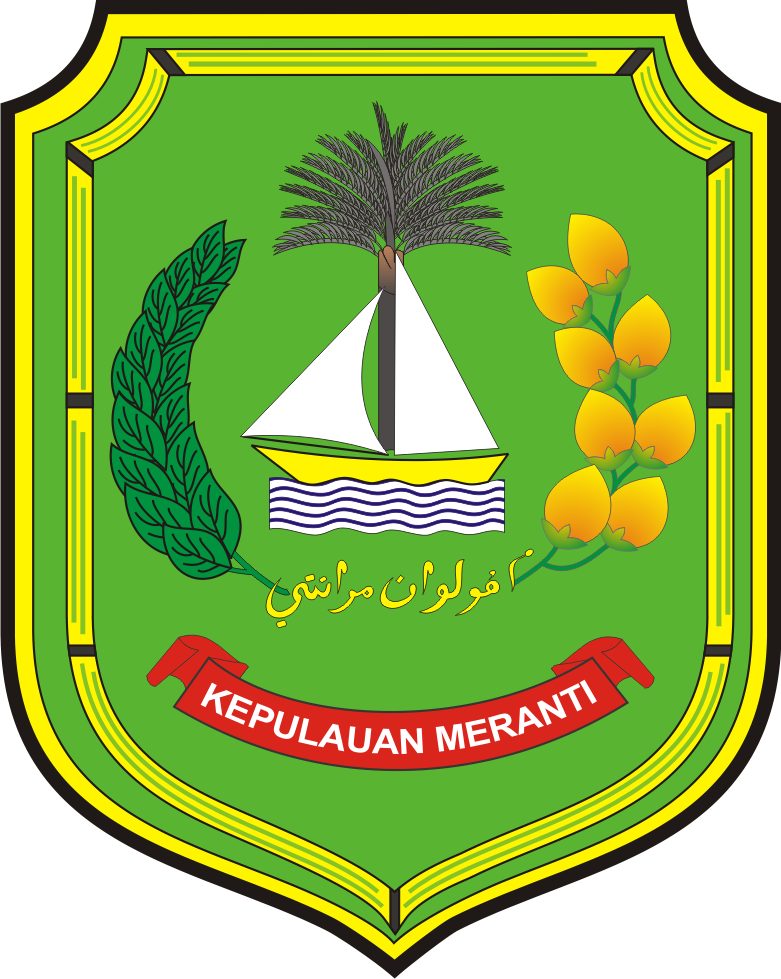
- Coat of arms

- Country: Indonesia
- Province: Riau
- Regency seat: Selat Panjang

Government
  - Regent: Asmar
  - Vice Regent: Muzamil Baharudin

Area
  - Total: 3,144.18 km^{2} (1,213.97 sq mi)

Population (mid 2025 estimate)
  - Total: 212,289
  - Density: 67.5181/km^{2} (174.871/sq mi)
- Time zone: UTC+7 (WIB)
- Website: www.merantikab.go.id

Meranti Islands (Kepulauan Meranti) is an archipelago, most of which forms a regency (kabupaten) of Riau Province and lies off the eastern coast of the island of Sumatra, Indonesia. It was created on 19 December 2008 by the separating of these large islands from the mainly mainland regency of Bengkalis. The regency comprises the islands of Tebing Tinggi, Rangsang, Padang, and Merbau, together with minor offshore islands, but does not include Bengkalis Island to the north, which is geographically part of the archipelago but remains within Bengkalis Regency. The principal town is Selat Panjang (also written as Selatpanjang) on Tebing Tinggi Island. The regency covers a land area of 3,144.18 km^{2} and had a population of 176,290 at the 2010 Census and 206,116 at the 2020 Census; the official estimate as of mid 2025 was 212,289 (comprising 109,307 males and 102,916 females).

== Administrative districts ==
When created in 2008, the regency was divided into five districts (kecamatan), listed below with their populations at the 2010 Census:

Name of District (kecamatan)	English name	Pop'n Census 2010
Tebing Tinggi Barat	Western Tebing Tinggi Island	15,260
Tebing Tinggi	(Eastern) Tebing Tinggi Island	65,748
Rangsang	(Eastern) Rangsang Island	26,526
Rangsang Barat	Western Rangsang Island	24,926
Merbau	Merbau and Padang Islands	44,030

On 26 January 2011, the regency was re-divided into nine districts. The additional four districts are Tebing Tinggi Timur (East Tebing Tinggi Island, leaving the residual area of Tebing Tinggi District to cover the town of Selat Panjang and its surroundings), Rangsang Pesisir (Coastal Rangsang, actually the central part of that island), Pulau Merbau (Merbau Island, leaving the residual area of Merbau District to cover the southern part of Padang Island) and Tasik Putri Puyu (covering the northern part of Padang Island). The areas and the populations of the nine districts at the 2020 Census, together with the official estimates as of mid 2025, are as follows. The table also includes the locations of the district administrative centres, the number of administrative villages in each district (totaling 96 rural desa and 5 urban kelurahan), and its postcode.

Kode Wilayah	Name of District (kecamatan)	Area in km^{2}	Pop'n 2020 Census	Pop'n mid 2025 Estimate	Admin centre	No. of villages	Post code
14.10.04	Tebing Tinggi Barat	489.87	18,382	19,688	Alai	14	28758
14.10.01	Tebing Tinggi (town)	89.45	67,219	66,260	Selat Panjang	9 ^{(a)}	28753
14.10.07	Tebing Tinggi Timur	637.61	13,293	14,321	Sungai Tohor	10	28754
	Sub-totals for Tebing Tinggi Island	1,216.93	99,851	100,269		33	
14.10.03	Rangsang	319.77	20,123	20,797	Tanjung Samak	14	28755
14.10.09	Rangsang Pesisir (Coastal Rangsang)	198.12	18,853	19,828	Telesung	11	28757
14.10.02	Rangsang Barat	95.65	19,488	20,248	Bantar	12	28756
	Sub-totals for Rangsang Island	613.54	58,464	60,873		37	
14.10.05	Merbau	534.04	15,305	16,055	Teluk Belitung	10 ^{(b)}	28752
14.10.06	Pulau Merbau	216.07	15,824	17,141	Semukut	11	28750
14.10.08	Tasik Putri Puyu	563.60	17,629	17,951	Bandul	10	28751
	Totals for Regency	3,144.18	206,116	212,289	Selatpanjang	101	

Notes: (a) comprising 4 kelurahan (Selat Panjang Barat, Selat Panjang Kota, Selat Panjang Selatan and Selat Panjang Timur) - with 42,723 inhabitants altogether in 2023 - and 5 desa.
(b) including one kelurahan - Teluk Belitung - with 5,062 inhabitants in 2023.

The island of Tebing Tinggi comprises three districts - Tebing Tinggi itself in the centre of its north coast, Tebing Tinggi Barat in the west of the island and Tebing Tinggi Timur in the east. The island of Rangsang is also composed of three districts - Rangsang Barat in the west, Rangsang Pesisir in the centre (in spite of its name!) and Rangsang in the east (including smaller islands off its southeast end). Padang Island is composed of two districts - Tasik Putri Puyu in the north and Merbau in the south (note Merbau District is now entirely on Padang Island and does not contain any part of Merbau Island). Merbau Island (Pulau Merbau) is identical with the district of that name.
