= Pekanbaru City Regional House of Representatives =

Pekanbaru City Regional House of Representatives Dewan Perwakilan Rakyat Daerah Kota Pekanbaru
- 2024–2029 period

Type
- Type: Unicameral
- Term limits: 5 years

History
- New session started: 6 September 2024

Leadership
- Speaker: Muhammad Isa Lahamid, S.T., M.H., PKS since 30 October 2024
- 1st Vice Speaker: T. Azwendi Fajri, S.E., Democratic since 30 October 2024
- 2nd Vice Speaker: Muhammad Dikky Suryadi Khusaini, S.H., PDI-P since 30 October 2024
- 3rd Vice Speaker: Andry Saputra, Gerindra since 30 October 2024

Structure
- Seats: 50
- Political groups: Government (16) Democratic (8) PKS (8) Others (34) Gerindra (7) PDI-P (7) Golkar (5) PAN (6) NasDem (5) PKB (2) Hanura (2)

Elections
- Voting system: Open list
- Last election: 14 February 2024

Meeting place
- Pekanbaru City Regional House of Representatives Building; Jend. Sudirman Street Number 454; Tanah Datar, Pekanbaru Kota, Pekanbaru; Riau, Indonesia

Website
- dprd.pekanbaru.go.id

The Pekanbaru City Regional House of Representatives (Indonesian: Dewan Perwakilan Rakyat Daerah Kota Pekanbaru, DPRD Kota Pekanbaru) is the unicameral municipal legislature of Pekanbaru, Riau, Indonesia. It has 50 members, who are elected every five years, simultaneously with the national legislative election.

== Legal basis ==
The legislature for Pekanbaru was formed along with those of other cities in Riau under Law Number 8 of 1956, which organized city governments within the province.

== General election results ==
=== 2024 Indonesian legislative election ===
The official valid votes received by political parties contesting the 2024 Indonesian legislative election in each electoral district (constituency) for members of the Pekanbaru City Regional House of Representatives are as follows.

2024 Indonesian legislative election results

Electoral district	PKB	Gerindra	PDI-P	Golkar	NasDem	Labour	Gelora	PKS	PKN	Hanura	Garuda	PAN	PBB	Democratic	PSI	Perindo	PPP	Ummat	Valid votes
Pekanbaru City 1	2,943	7,029	6,692	6,345	4,742	147	197	8,765	46	3,017	0	9,762	179	6,501	2,438	262	377	943	60,385
Pekanbaru City 2	4,491	5,781	12,947	13,060	12,903	215	251	9,546	48	4,434	0	4,980	72	7,622	1,431	3,374	2,562	590	84,307
Pekanbaru City 3	5,293	6,836	9,893	11,427	6,801	122	1,488	12,808	245	5,541	0	5,360	237	9,723	2,377	1,438	3,223	1,112	83,924
Pekanbaru City 4	2,831	7,381	6,937	8,745	4,696	188	1,115	11,978	63	7,722	0	5,397	186	5,979	224	309	1,452	1,371	66,574
Pekanbaru City 5	5,053	7,260	7,132	3,045	13,176	105	725	12,724	55	5,050	0	5,890	78	7,245	1,161	238	4,064	374	73,375
Pekanbaru City 6	6,265	10,837	8,510	8,475	16,218	233	4,935	24,756	80	254	0	8,162	370	16,780	3,052	609	1,956	1,911	113,403
Pekanbaru City 7	2,149	8,604	13,367	3,271	5,508	236	371	9,156	48	4,154	0	6,819	79	5,888	4,777	1,380	646	602	67,055
Total	29,025	53,728	65,478	54,368	64,044	1,246	9,082	89,733	585	30,172	0	46,370	1,201	59,738	15,460	7,610	14,280	6,903	549,023
Source: General Elections Commission of Indonesia

== Composition ==
The following is the composition of members of the Pekanbaru City Regional House of Representatives in the last three periods.

Party	Total seats		
Party	2014–2019	2019–2024	2024–2029
PKB seats	4	▼0	▲2
Gerindra seats	4	▲7	7
PDI-P seats	5	▲6	▲7
Golkar seats	7	▼4	▲5
NasDem seats	3	▼1	▲5
PKS seats	3	▲8	8
Hanura seats	4	▲5	▼2
PAN seats	5	▲6	6
Demokrat seats	6	▲7	▲8
PPP seats	4	▼1	▼0
Total Seats	45	45	▲50
Total Party	10	▼9	9

== Electoral District ==
In the 2019 Legislative Election, the Pekanbaru City Regional House of Representatives election was divided into 6 electoral districts as follows:

Electoral District Name	Electoral District Area	Number of Seats
PEKANBARU CITY 1	Sukajadi, Pekanbaru Kota, Lima Puluh	6
PEKANBARU CITY 2	Rumbai, Rumbai Pesisir	7
PEKANBARU CITY 3	Sail, Tenayan Raya	7
PEKANBARU CITY 4	Bukit Raya, Marpoyan Damai	11
PEKANBARU CITY 5	Tampan	8
PEKANBARU CITY 6	Senapelan, Payung Sekaki	6
TOTAL		45

In the 2024 Legislative Election, the Pekanbaru City Regional House of Representatives election was divided into 7 electoral districts as follows:

Electoral District Name	Electoral District Area	Number of Seats
PEKANBARU CITY 1	Sukajadi, Pekanbaru Kota, Lima Puluh	6
PEKANBARU CITY 2	Rumbai Barat, Rumbai, Rumbai Timur	7
PEKANBARU CITY 3	Tenayan Raya, Kulim	8
PEKANBARU CITY 4	Sail, Bukit Raya	6
PEKANBARU CITY 5	Marpoyan Damai	7
PEKANBARU CITY 6	Binawidya, Tuahmadani	10
PEKANBARU CITY 7	Senapelan, Payung Sekaki	6
TOTAL		50

== See also ==
- Pekanbaru
- Riau
