= Bengkalis Regency =

Regency in Riau, Indonesia

Bengkalis Regency Kabupaten Bengkalis
- Regency
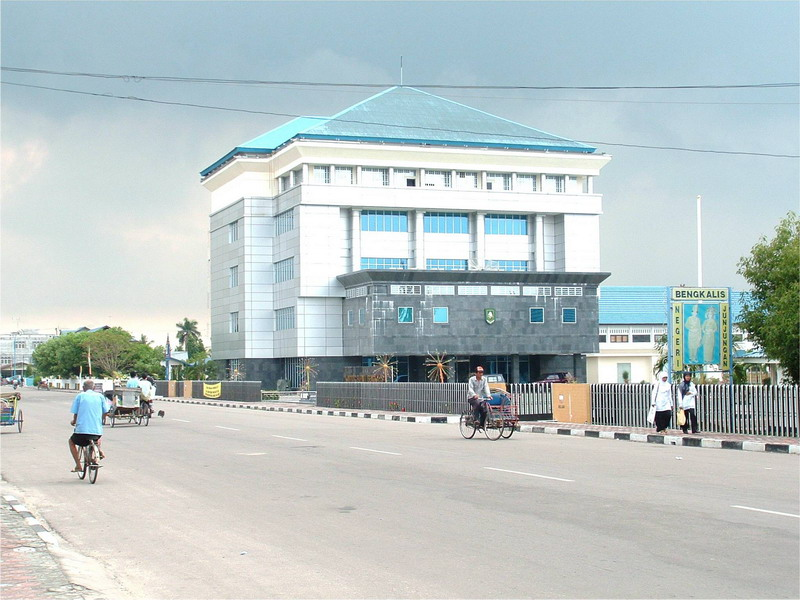
- Regency office of Bengkalis

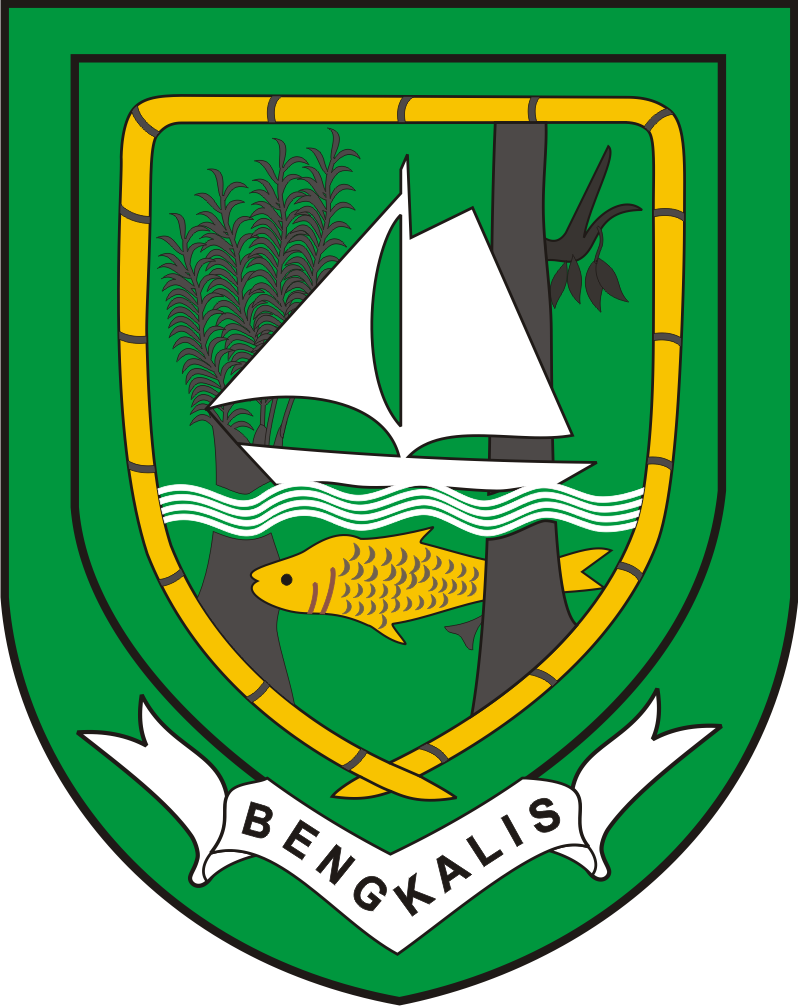
- Coat of arms
- Motto: Negeri Junjungan
- Location of Bengkalis Regency in Riau province
- Coordinates: 1°29′23″N 102°4′47″E
- Country: Indonesia
- Province: Riau
- Regency seat: Bengkalis

Government
  - Regent: Kasmarni
  - Vice Regent: Bagus Santoso

Area
  - Total: 8,612.56 km^{2} (3,325.33 sq mi)

Population (mid 2025 estimate)
  - Total: 693,035
  - Density: 80.4679/km^{2} (208.411/sq mi)
- Time zone: UTC+7 (WIB)

Bengkalis Regency is a regency of Indonesia in Riau Province. The regency was originally established in 1956 and then included most of the northern part of the province, but on 4 October 1999 it was divided up, with most of the territory being split off to form the new Rokan Hilir Regency, Siak Regency and the city of Dumai. On 19 December 2008 a further five districts were removed to create the new Meranti Islands Regency, leaving eight districts (or kecamatan) in the Bengkalis Regency, including the complete islands of Bengkalis and Rupat in the Malacca Strait as well as portions of the Sumatra mainland. These eight districts have increased since 2010 to eleven by the splitting of existing districts on the Sumatran mainland.

Bengkalis Regency produces natural resources, particularly petroleum, rubber, and coconut. The southern part of this regency contains a large part of the Bukit Batu Biosphere Reserve.

== Etymology ==
The origin of the name Bengkalis is taken from the words "Mengkal" which means sad or emotional and "Kalis" which means steadfast, patient and enduring. This word is taken from the expression of the Raja Kecil to his servants and followers when he arrived in Bengkalis when he wanted to overthrow the Johor Sultanate's rule over eastern Sumatra. The expression goes as follows: "Mengkal feels my heart because I am not recognized as the Sultan who rules the country, but it does not matter, we are still Kalis in accepting this situation.” This expression became a topic of conversation among the people that the king was "Mengkal" but still "Kalis". Finally, the expression became the saying "Oh, your king is Mengkalis". From this saying arose the word "mengkalis", which evolved into the modern place name "Bengkalis".

== History ==
Bengkalis was part of the old kingdoms that controlled the Strait of Malacca region and is thought to have been first inhabited by Sea People who inhabited the northern and southern coastal areas who believe that they originated from Bukit Siguntang. Because the Melaka Sultanate was founded by Parameswara, a descendant of Sang Nila Utama, the founder of the Kingdom of Singapura, located in modern Singapore, the Orang Laut's loyalty to Melaka is unwavering. Recorded Orang Laut settlements on Bengkalis Island include Tanjung Parit in the present-day Muntai Village, Bantan District, and the Senggeren Tribe settlement at the mouth of the Bengkalis River. In Tanjung Parit, the Orang Laut were led by a leader who was very loyal to the Sultanate. This group of Orang Laut were ready to be deployed at any time to defend Melaka's interests, if needed with excellent sea navigation skills such as reading wind direction, stargazing, knowledge of the seasons, and other sea skills. The Orang Laut were known as skilled and resilient sailors. Melaka's conquest of Bengkalis, led by Bendahara Tun Perak, is also believed to be the beginning of the arrival of Islam in Bengkalis. Although Bengkalis may have previously been exposed to Islam through Indian and Arab traders who came to Bengkalis, the expansion of Malacca, accompanied by the spread of Islam, had a deeper meaning and its reach to the community of Bengkalis was much broader. The word Bengkalis itself was recorded as early as 1575 on a map made by Fernão vas Dourado, which on that map was called Bamcallis. Then in a Dutch map made by Willem Lodewycksz in 1596 and first published in 1598, Bengkalis was called Bancalis. Emanuel Gordinho de Eredia, in his book Declaracam de Malaca e India Meridional com o Cathay, published in 1613, referred to Bengkalis as Bencales. This book is a record of Gordinho's travels from Malacca, India to Cathay. Meanwhile, in the Insulae Indiae Orientalis, a Dutch map from the Mercator/Hondius/Jansson series produced in 1635, Bengkalis is written as Bacalis. Meanwhile, in local sources such as the Hikayat Siak or Tuhfat al Nafis, Bengkalis is written as Mengkalis. This indicates that during the 19th century, when these Malay manuscripts were written, Bengkalis was known as Mengkalis. The same is true in the Hikayat Awang Sulung Merah Muda and Hikayat Terang Pipit.

Bengkalis was founded on 30 July 1512. In 1645, the regency was just a fishing village. The word Bengkalis was also recorded in history in 1511 in a book about Malacca entitled The Suma Oriental written by the Portuguese writer Tomé Pires. He provides a clear and specific picture of the life of the Malacca people from 1400 to 1515. The story is set while Pires was in the cosmopolitan city of Malacca from 1512 to 1515, the early years of the Portuguese conquest of Malacca. In 1678, Bengkalis became a meeting place for Malay, Javanese and Arab traders who brought their goods along with traders from Palembang, Jambi, Indragiri, Aceh, Kedah, Perak, Kelong, Johor, Penang, Petani, Thailand, Cambodia, Kochi, China and the Minangkabau people. They were Sumatrans who came to Bengkalis to collect salt, rice and fish caught in abundance by the people living around the Strait of Malacca. In 1717, Bengkalis was used as a line of attack against Johor by Raja Kecil. It was in Bengkalis that he assembled his military forces and then founded the Buantan Kingdom, later called the Siak Kingdom, in 1723. When the Siak Kingdom was founded, Bengkalis and Bukit Batu served as outposts for its defense, led by Datuk Laksamana Raja di Laut. Datuk Laksamana Raja di Laut built a powerful fleet and built warships equipped with weapons imported from Islamic countries. Later, during the Dutch East Indies rule, Bengkalis served as the capital of the East Sumatra Residency. However, the Dutch later moved the residency capital from Bengkalis to Medan. After this move, Bengkalis served as the capital of the Bengkalis Afdeling until the end of the Dutch rule in Indonesia. Meanwhile, during the Japanese occupation of the Dutch East Indies, Bengkalis was made the capital of Bengkalis Bun.

== Geography ==
Bengkalis Regency comprises the whole of Bengkalis Island and Rupat Island, which are located in the Straits of Malacca, together with a wide swathe of the eastern coastal area of Sumatra Island and stretching inland along the drainage area of the Siak River, as well as including other islands within the archipelago to its north-east. The land area covers 8,612.56 km^{2} and it borders on the Malacca Straits to the north, on Siak Regency to the south, on the Meranti Islands Regency to the southeast, and on Dumai City, Rokan Hilir Regency and Rokan Hulu Regency to the west. The administrative centre is the town of Bengkalis on the south coast of the island of the same name.

The Bengkalis Strait separates Bengkalis Island from Sumatra as well as from Padang Island and Tebing Tinggi Island.

=== Climate ===
Bengkalis Island has a tropical rainforest climate (Af) with heavy to very heavy rainfall year-round.

Climate data for Bengkalis
Month	Jan	Feb	Mar	Apr	May	Jun	Jul	Aug	Sep	Oct	Nov	Dec	Year
Mean daily maximum °C (°F)	31.5 (88.7)	32.0 (89.6)	32.4 (90.3)	32.3 (90.1)	32.3 (90.1)	32.0 (89.6)	31.8 (89.2)	31.8 (89.2)	31.7 (89.1)	31.8 (89.2)	31.4 (88.5)	31.5 (88.7)	31.9 (89.4)
Daily mean °C (°F)	26.7 (80.1)	27.0 (80.6)	27.3 (81.1)	27.4 (81.3)	27.5 (81.5)	27.2 (81.0)	27.0 (80.6)	27.0 (80.6)	26.9 (80.4)	27.0 (80.6)	26.8 (80.2)	26.8 (80.2)	27.1 (80.7)
Mean daily minimum °C (°F)	21.9 (71.4)	22.1 (71.8)	22.3 (72.1)	22.6 (72.7)	22.7 (72.9)	22.5 (72.5)	22.2 (72.0)	22.2 (72.0)	22.2 (72.0)	22.3 (72.1)	22.3 (72.1)	22.1 (71.8)	22.3 (72.1)
Average rainfall mm (inches)	176 (6.9)	127 (5.0)	199 (7.8)	236 (9.3)	193 (7.6)	135 (5.3)	124 (4.9)	166 (6.5)	229 (9.0)	273 (10.7)	305 (12.0)	255 (10.0)	2,418 (95)
Source: Climate-Data.org

== Demographics ==
=== Population ===
Following the splitting in 2008 of the regency to create a new Meranti Islands Regency, the residual area of Bengkalis Regency had a population of 498,336 at the 2010 census and 565,569 at the 2020 census; the official estimate as of mid 2025 was 693,035.

=== Religion ===
In 1930, a Muhammadiyah branch was established in Bengkalis. To open the Muhammadiyah branch in Bengkalis, the Muhammadiyah Central Board sent Abdul Malik Karim Amrullah, better known as Buya Hamka, who at that time served as Chairman of the Muhammadiyah Padang Panjang Branch. It is recorded that Muhammad Rasami, who had served as Secretary of the Muhammadiyah Bengkalis Branch Board at that time, was also appointed. In 1936 in Medan, Rasami, along with Asbiran Yakub, Chairman of the Medan Al-Busyra Foundation, asked Hamka to lead the weekly Pedoman Masyarakat.

== Administrative districts ==
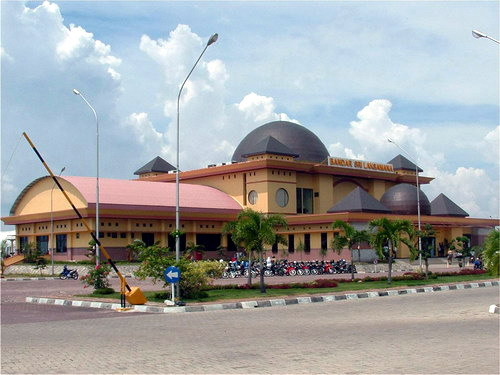
Bandar Sri Laksamana, the main port of Bengkalis

The eleven districts (kecamatan) currently forming the regency are listed below with their areas and their populations at the 2010 and 2020 censuses, together with the official estimates as of mid 2025. The table also includes the locations of the district administrative centres, the number of administrative villages in each district (a total of 136 rural desa and 19 urban kelurahan), and its post code.

Kode Wilayah	Name of District (kecamatan)	Area in km^{2}	Pop'n census 2010	Pop'n census 2020	Pop'n estimate mid 2025	Admin centre	No. of villages	Post code
14.03.09	Mandau	517.06	219,264	152,258	174,714	Air Jamban	11 ^{(a)}	28783
14.03.13	Pinggir	774.42	78,404	62,098	81,520	Pinggir	10 ^{(b)}	28784
14.03.16	Bathin Solapan	673.71	^{(c)}	91,586	124,996	Sebangar	13	28785
14.03.15	Talang Muandau	1,378.74	^{(d)}	24,000	34,995	Beringin	9	28786
Sub-total	Southern (inland) group	3,343.93	297,668	329,942	416,225		43	
14.03.03	Bukit Batu	597.44	30,129	21,771	23,878	Sungai Pakning	10 ^{(e)}	28761
14.03.12	Siak Kecil	947.50	18,709	24,186	29,582	Lubuk Muda	17	28771
14.03.14	Bandar Laksamana	1,301.45	^{(f)}	15,842	20,481	Tenggayun	7	28762
Sub-total	Northern (coastal) group	2,846.39	48,838	61,799	73,941		34	
14.03.10	Rupat	1,143.72	30,550	34,719	42,761	Batu Panjang	16 ^{(g)}	28781
14.03.11	Rupat Utara ^{(i)}	377.14	13,020	14,117	17,890	Tanjung Medang	8	28782
14.03.01	Bengkalis (district)	440.10	72,221	83,085	94,951	Bengkalis Kota	31 ^{(h)}	28711: 28741
14.03.02	Bantan ^{(j)}	461.28	36,039	41,907	47,267	Selat Baru	23	28763
Sub-total	Offshore islands group	2,422.24	151,830	173,828	202,869		89	
	Total Regency	8,612.56	498,336	565,569	693,035	Bengkalis	155	

Notes: (a) comprising 9 kelurahan (Air Jamban, Babussalam, Balik Alam, Batang Serosa, Duri Barat, Duri Timur, Gajah Sakti, Pematang Pudu and Makeruh (Talang Mandi)) and 2 desa (Harapan Baru and Bathin Bertuah).
(b) comprising 2 kelurahan (Balai Raja and Titian Antui) and 8 desa.
(c) the 2010 population of the new Bathin Solapan District is included in the figure for Mandau District, from which it was cut out.
(d) the 2010 population of the new Talang Muandau District is included in the figure for Pinggir District, from which it was cut out.
(e) including one kelurahan (Sungai Pakning).
(f) the 2010 population of the new Bandar Laksamana District is included in the figure for Bukit Batu District, from which it was cut out.
(g) comprising 4 kelurahan (Batu Panjang, Pergam, Tanjung Kapal and Terkul) and 12 desa.
(h) comprising 3 kelurahan (Bengkalis Kota, Damon and Rimba Sekampung) and 28 desa.
(i) the northern part of Rupat Island. (j) the northern part of Bengkalis Island.

Bengkalis Island comprises Bengkalis District and Bantan District, while Rupat Island comprises Rupat District and Rupat Utara (North Rupat) District. The remaining seven districts lie on Sumatra Island - Bukit Batu, Siak Kecil and Bandar Laksamana being on the Sumatran coast, while Mandau, Pinggir, Bathin Solapan and Talang Muandau are inland districts further south.

== Economy ==
According to data from the Central Statistics Agency (Badan Pusat Statistik; BPS), per capita expenditure in Bengkalis reaches IDR 12,153 million per year. This figure makes Bengkalis the fifth-highest-spending regency in Riau. Despite being a regency with a high cost of living, Bengkalis, approximately 173 kilometers from Pekanbaru, has managed to control its poverty rate. Furthermore, according to BPS data, the poverty rate in Bengkalis was 6.31 percent in 2023, which is lower than the average poverty rate in Riau, which is 6.68 percent.

Bengkalis is an archipelago rich in natural resources, ranging from mining and fisheries to plantations. This is evident in the gross regional domestic product (GRDP), which is still supported by two dominant sectors: quarrying and mining, which contributes 59.13 percent, followed by the manufacturing industry, which contributes 16 percent. However, Bengkalis faces challenges, including economic accessibility and a culture that has led to underdevelopment. Many Bengkalis residents still live in poverty, stemming from a lack of access to capital, particularly from banks. For example, coastal residents lack access to People's Business Credit (Kredit Usaha Rakyat; KUR). This situation leaves residents short of capital to expand their businesses or increase their boat capacity, forcing coastal fishermen to make do with the limited catch from riverbanks. Economic activity is also concentrated in the city capital of Bengkalis Regency, creating disparities between sub-districts. Bengkalis has had the potential for greatness since ancient times. Located in the Golden Triangle, Bengkalis is flanked by two countries, namely Malaysia and Singapore. Due to its strategic location, Bengkalis was a target for several nations during the colonial period, including the Portuguese, Dutch, and Japanese.

== Education ==
Apart from the people's schools founded by the Dutch East Indies Government, in Bengkalis there were also religious schools founded by people who cared about education. In the mid-1920s, Tuan Guru Haji Ahmad opened a religious school at the Batu Mosque (the current Grand Mosque of Parit Bangkong) with a halaqah system. In 1929, Zakaria bin Muhammad Amin, who had just arrived from Pahang, British Malaya, joined in teaching at the school. Apart from teaching, he also studied with Ahmad. Those who taught together at this school were Muhammad Toha, Muhammad Sidik and Ismail. In 1933, Zakaria went back to Perak to increase his religious knowledge and after returning to Bengkalis in 1937, he founded the Al Khairiyah school which was the first formal school or boarding school in Bengkalis. It was closed when the Japanese entered Bengkalis and teaching and learning activities were disbanded, and the students were returned to their respective hometowns. The location of Al Khairiyah School is on Jalan Sultan Syarif Kasim, on the site of the former Dayang Dermah Orphanage. Besides Bengkalis itself, students who studied at this school came from various areas such as Selat Panjang, Bagan Siapi-api, Rupat, Tanah Putih, Merbau, Sungai Apit, Bukit Batu, Bangkinang and other areas. To continue the Al Khairiyah school, on 17 July 1963, Zakaria founded a madrasah named Mahbatul Ulum which was named on Jalan Gerilya. To this day, Mahbatul Ulum continues to carry out the teaching and learning process as an effort to improve the quality of the young generation of Bengkalis.

In 1931, Zainuddin Sal founded the HIS (Holland Inlandshe School) Muhammadiyah. The language of instruction at this school was Dutch, and the school lasted seven years. This school was affiliated with a similar school in Padang Panjang with the aim of developing cadres for the national movement. When the Dutch surrendered and the Japanese established their foothold in Bengkalis in 1942, HIS Muhammadiyah was closed. In 1937, HIS Esama was founded by Husi Jayadiningrat and other community members. This school also used Dutch as the language of instruction, and English was taught in the fourth grade. HIS Esama was also closed in 1942 when the Japanese conquered the Netherlands. In the same year, Samad founded the Khuliatul Mudharisin religious school and this school lasted until closed in 1950.

At the time of independence, precisely in the 1970s, Bengkalis had an important role, namely as a place to produce teachers, not only in Sumatra, but also to be sent to Malaysia, hence the term "cikgu-cikgu Bengkalis". At that time, it was not difficult to send teachers to Malaysia because there were no immigration checks so Bengkalis residents could freely enter Malaysia. Not surprisingly, many elementary school teachers from Bengkalis were sent to Malaysia. Now, most of the teachers sent have become Malaysian citizens and this has earned Bengkalis the nickname of the city of education.

== Notable people ==
- Iyeth Bustami (born 1973) – dangdut singer, actress and politician
- Soeman Hs (1904–1999) – author
