= Merbau Island =

Island in Riau, Indonesia

Coordinates: 1°09′N 102°21′E

Merbau Island is an island in Riau province, Indonesia, close to the east coast of Sumatra island. The area is 504 km^{2} and the population at the 2020 Census was 15,824; the official estimate as at mid 2023 was 16,845. Administratively, it forms the district (kecamatan) of Pulau Merbau within the Meranti Islands Regency of Riau province. The administrative centre of the district is at Semukut.
