= Padang Island =

Island in Riau, Indonesia

Coordinates: 1°09′N 102°21′E

Location of Padang in Riau Province

Padang Island is an island in Riau province, Indonesia, close to the east coast of Sumatra island. The area is 1,676.68 km² and the population at the 2020 Census was 32,934; the official estimate as at mid 2023 was 33,915. Administratively, it forms the districts (kecamatan) of Merbau (which covers the southern part of Padang Island, but does not include any part of nearby Merbau Island) and Tasik Putri Puyu (which covers the northern part of Padang Island), both districts being within the Meranti Islands Regency of Riau province. It should not be confused with the city of Padang, West Sumatra, or the island of Padang in Borneo.
