= Bengkalis, Bengkalis =

City in Indonesia

Coordinates: 1°29′23″N 102°04′47″E

Bengkalis
- Administrative district
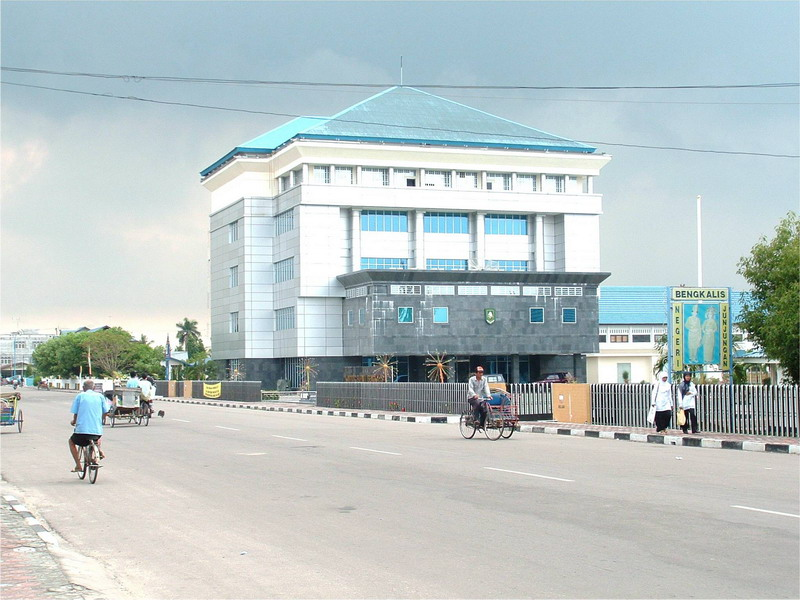
- Regency office of Bengkalis

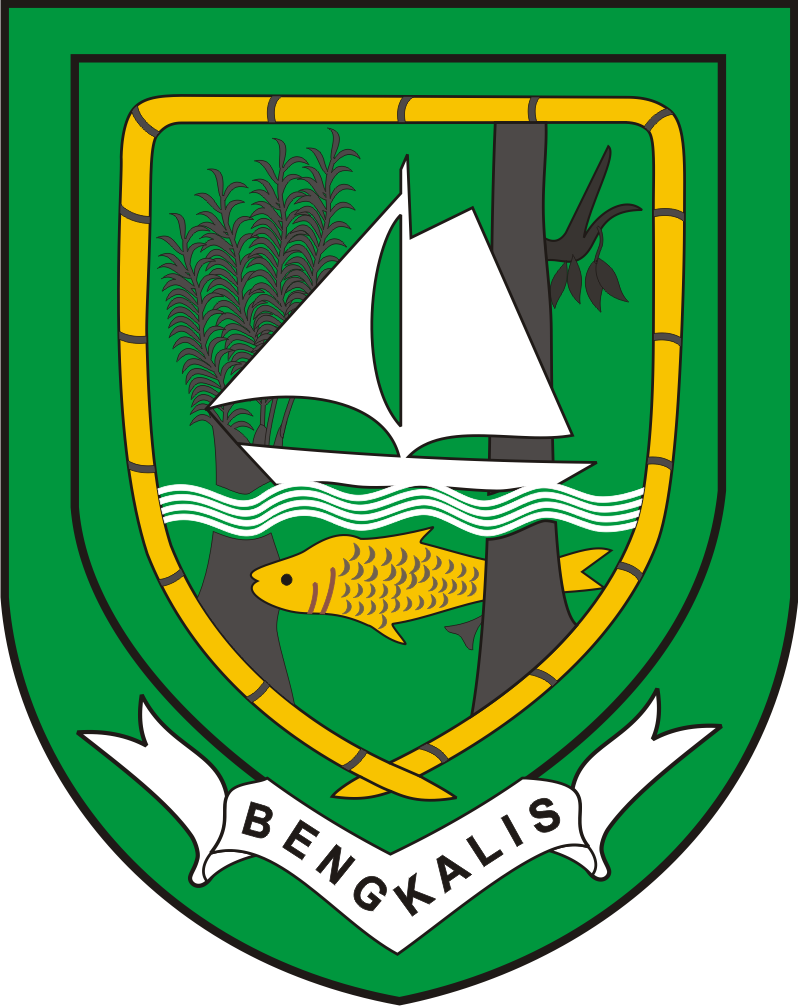
- Coat of arms
- Interactive map of Bengkalis
- Country: Indonesia
- Province: Riau
- Regency: Bengkalis Regency
- Established: 30 July 1512; 514 years ago

Area
  - Total: 514 km^{2} (198 sq mi)

Bengkalis is an administrative district (kecamatan) and a town which serves as the seat (capital) of Bengkalis Regency in the Riau province of Indonesia. It occupies the southern half of Bengkalis Island (including the far west). The rest of the island is occupied by Bantan District. The district had a population of over 94,000 in 2025.

Bengkalis has a hot and humid equatorial/tropical climate. The town is humid throughout the year, with daily temperatures ranging from 26 to 32°C.

== Administrative division ==
Bengkalis District is divided into 3 towns (kelurahan, namely Bengkalis Kota, Damon and Rimba Sekampung) and 28 villages (desa). The list runs from east to west, with populations as at mid 2024.

- Sekodi (1,963)
- Kelemantan (1,162)
- Ketam Puti (1,879)
- Pematang Duku (2,358)
- Penebal (2,159)
- Temeran (1,810)
- Penampi (1,753)
- Sungai Alam (3,023)
- Air Putih (4,296)
- Senggoro (9,107)
- Rimba Sekampung (5,572)
- Bengkalis Kota (5,919)
- Wonosari (9,902)
- Damon (5,497)
- Kelapa Pati (8,733)
- Pedekik (3,423)
- Pangkalan Batang (2,958)
- Sebauk (1,468)
- Teluk Latak (2,599)
- Meskom (1,972)
- Palkun (1,047)
- Kelemantan Barat (1,178)
- Sungai Batang (1,654)
- Pematang Duku Timur (1,505)
- Damai (1,760)
- Kelebuk (1,102)
- Kuala Alam (2,453)
- Pangkalan Batang Barat (1,975)
- Senderak (1,668)
- Prapat Tunggal (1,348)
- Simpang Ayam (1,230)
