= Pekanbaru =

Capital and largest city of Riau, Indonesia

- City
- City of Pekanbaru; Kota Pekanbaru

Other transcription(s)
  - Jawi: ڤكن بارو
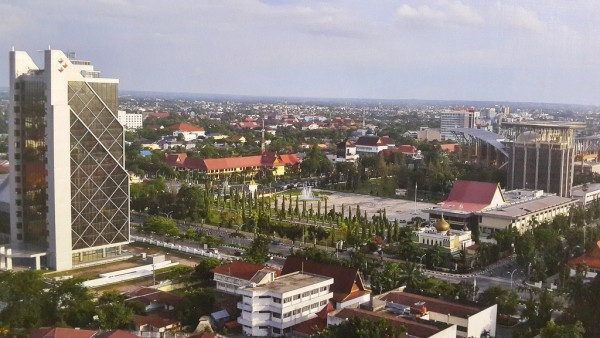
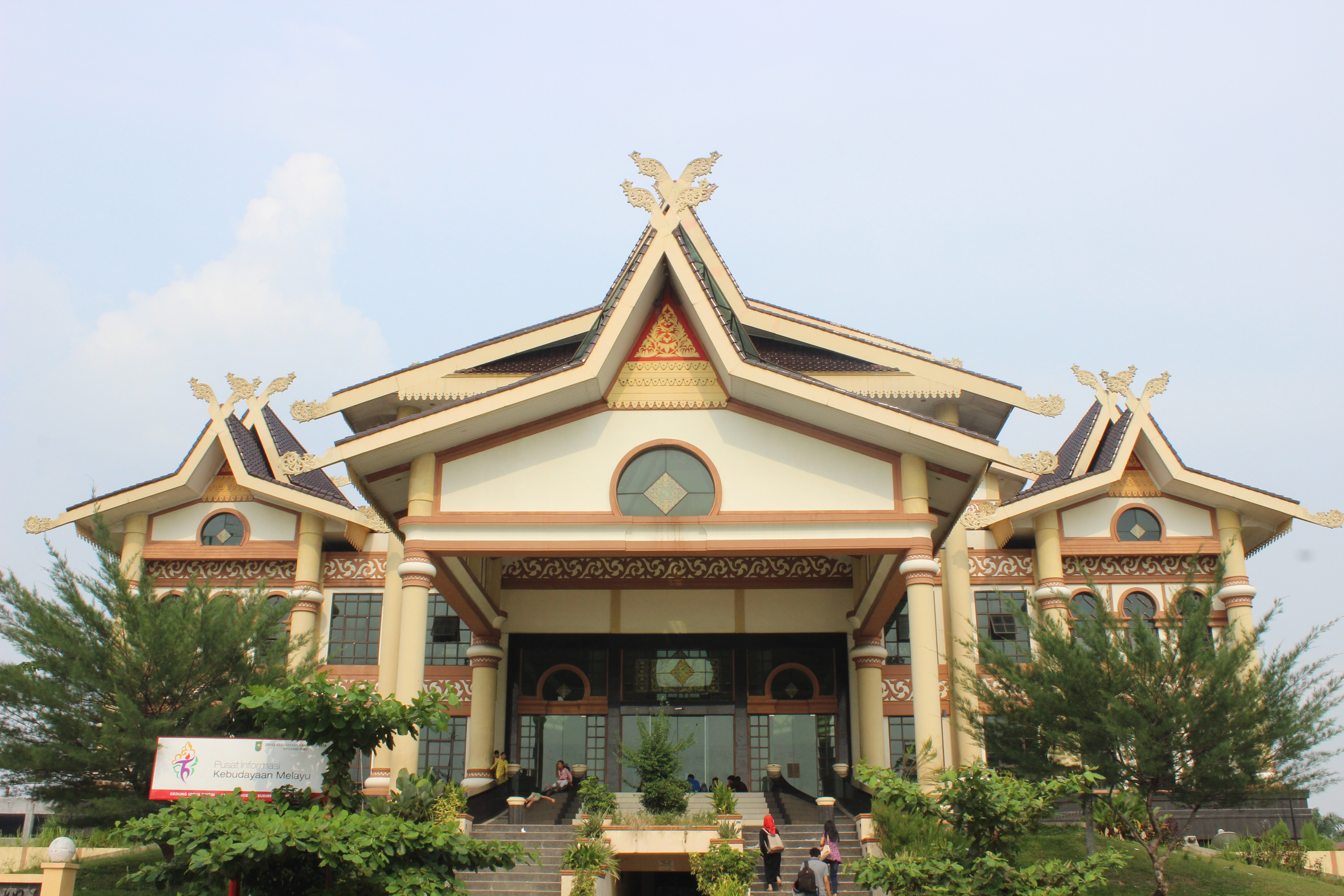
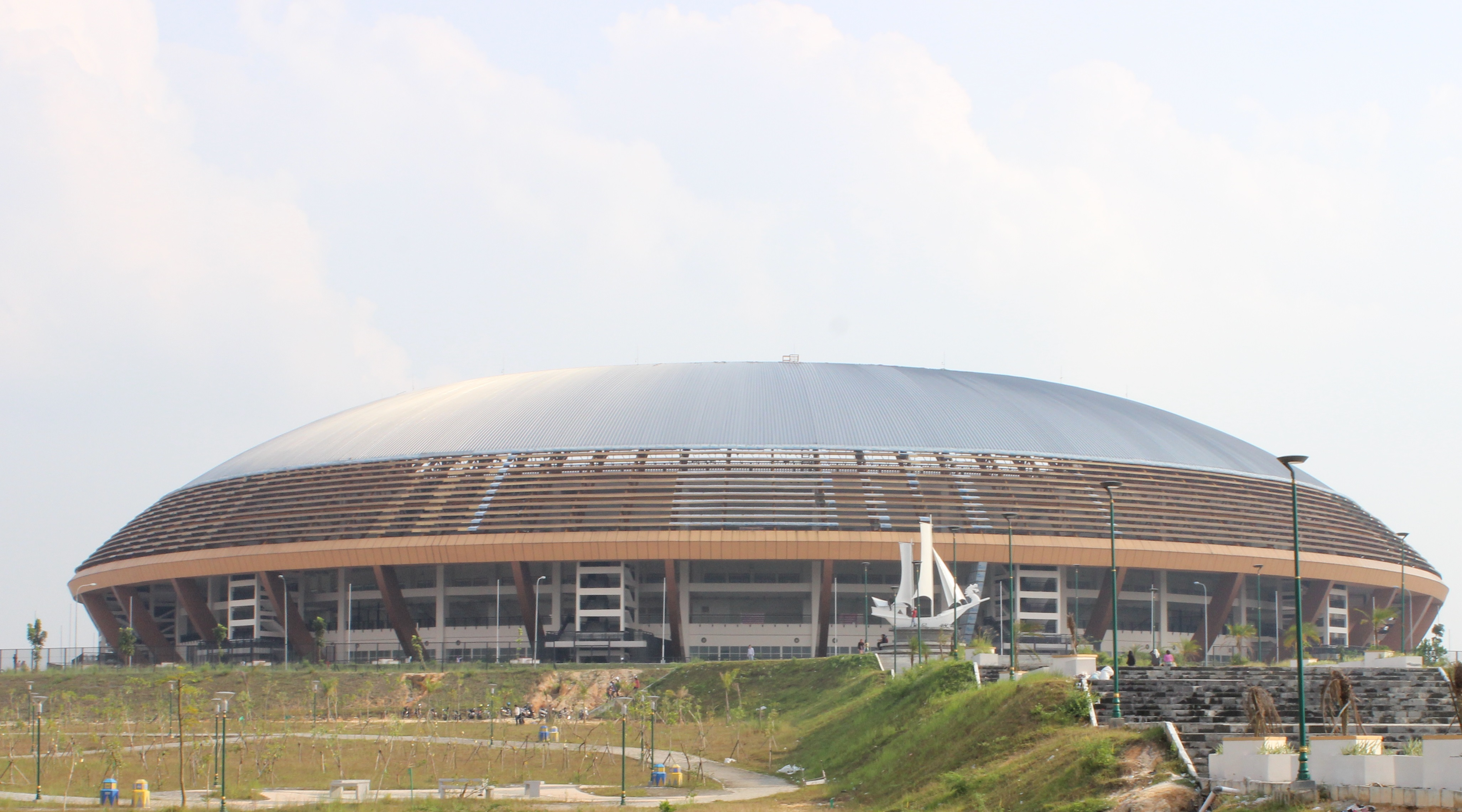
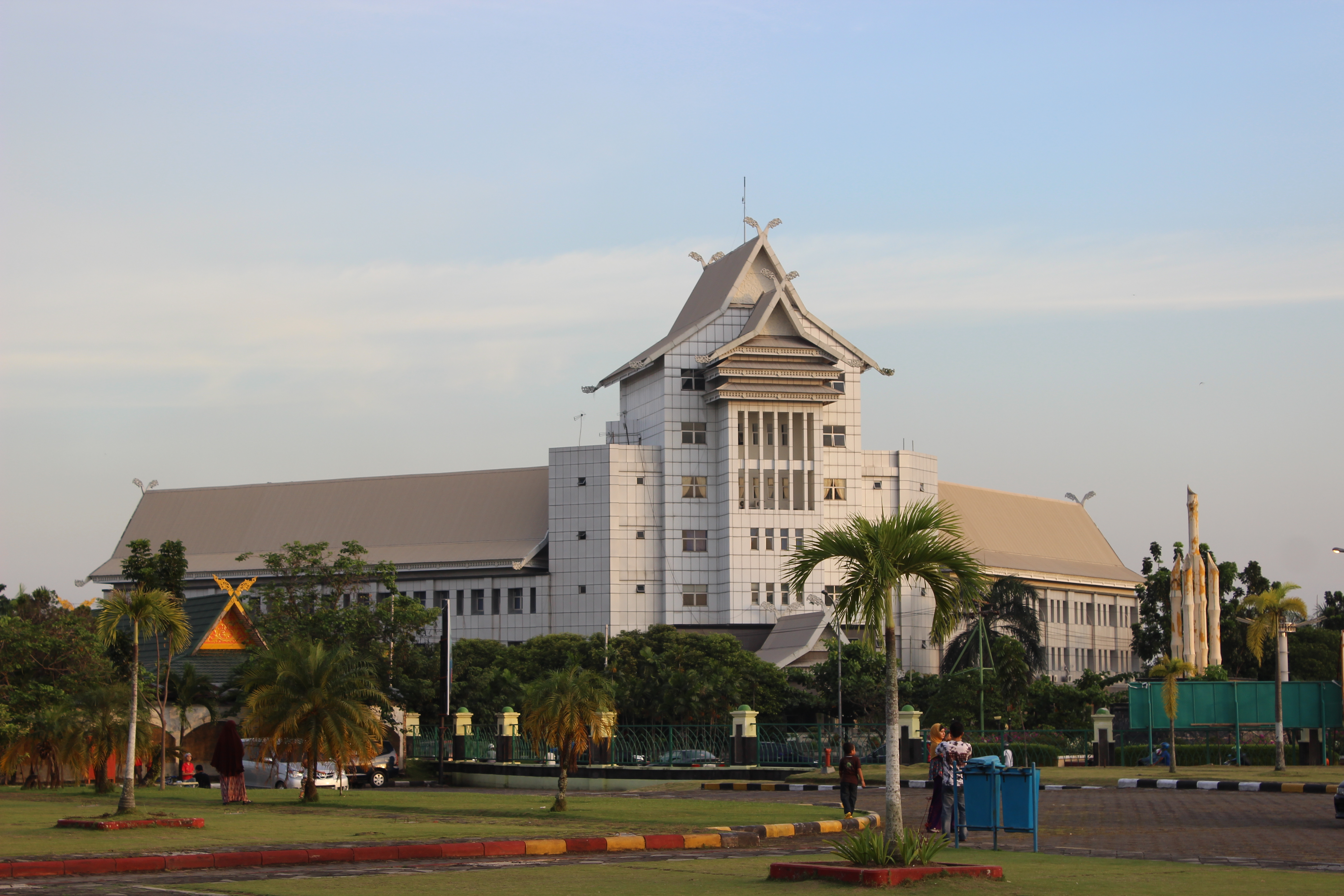
- Skyline of Pekanbaru Idrus Tintin cultural center Riau Main Stadium Soeman Hs Library University of Riau

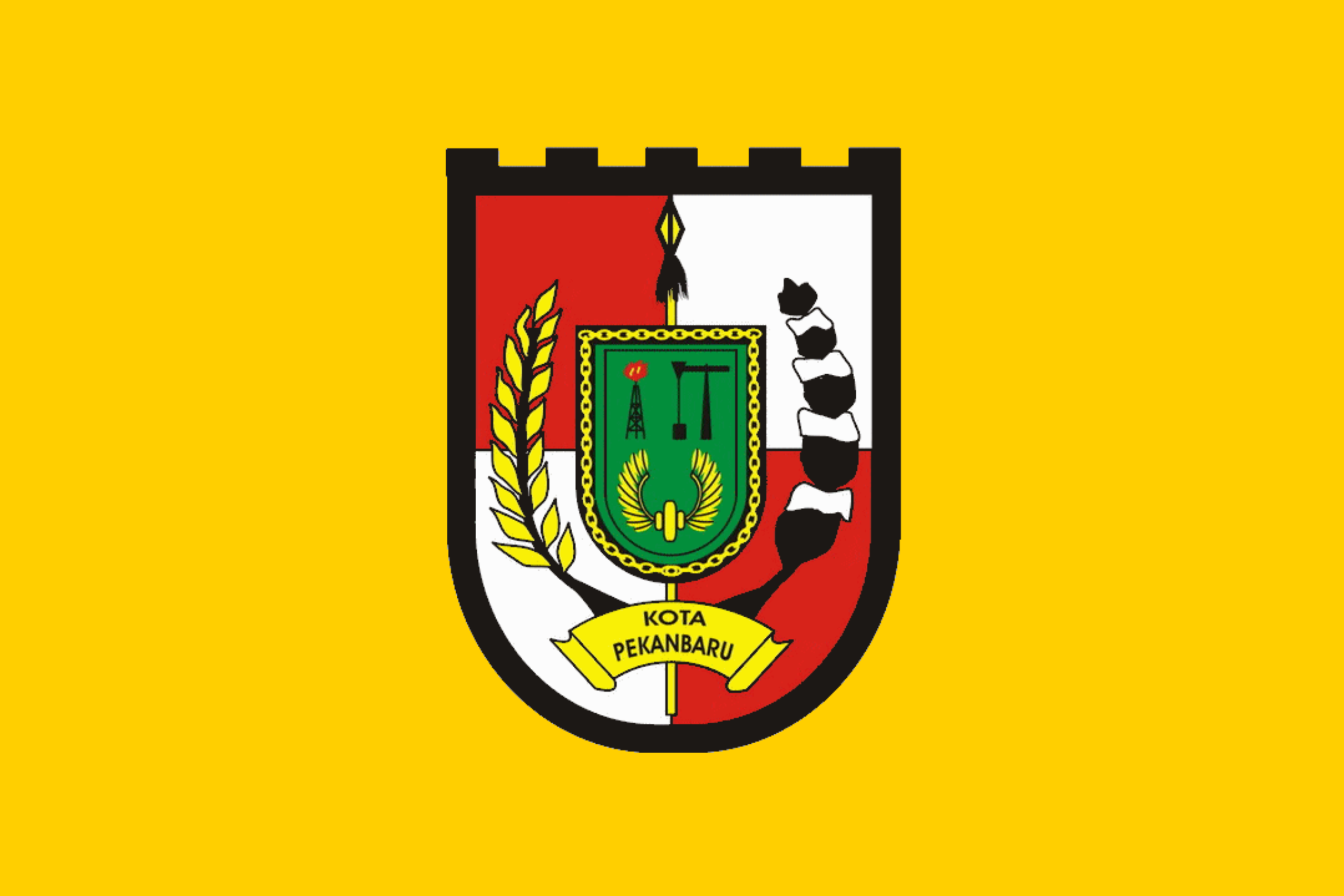
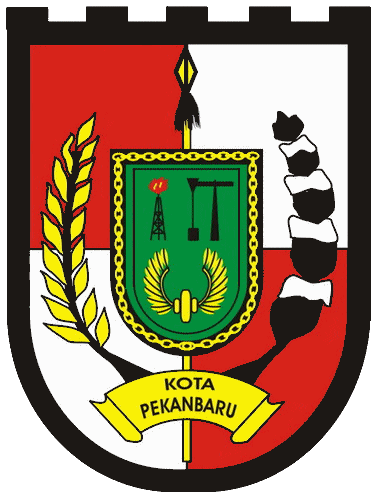
- Flag Coat of arms
- Nicknames: "PKU", "Pekan", "Pokan", "Pekanbaru", “Pekanbaghu”, "Kota Pekanbaru", "Kota Bertuah",
- Location of Pekanbaru in Indonesia
- Coordinates: 0°30′33″N 101°26′43″E
- Country: Indonesia
- Province: Riau
- Founded: 22 June 1784

Government
  - Type: Mayor-council
  - Body: Pekanbaru City Government
  - Mayor: Agung Nugroho (Democratic)
  - Vice Mayor: Markarius Anwar
  - Legislature: Pekanbaru City Regional House of Representatives (DPRD)

Area
  - City: 639.00 km^{2} (246.72 sq mi)
- Elevation: 12 m (39 ft)

Population (mid 2025 estimate)
  - City: 1,192,990
  - Density: 1,867.0/km^{2} (4,835.4/sq mi)
  - Urban: 1,285,353
  - Metro: 1,365,000
- Time zone: UTC+7 (WIB)
- Postal code: 28131
- Area code: +62 761
- Vehicle registration: BM
- Website: www.pekanbaru.go.id

Pekanbaru ([pəkanˈbaru]) is the capital city of the Indonesian province of Riau, and a major economic centre on the eastern side of Sumatra Island with its name derived from the Malay (Indonesian) word for 'new market' ('pekan' is market and 'baru' is new). It has an area of 639.00 km^{2} (246.72 sq mi), with a population of 897,767 at the 2010 Census, and 983,356 at the 2020 Census; the official estimate as of mid 2025 was 1,192,990 (comprising 599,452 males and 593,538 females), and was projected to be 1,228,298 as at mid 2026. It is located on the banks of the Siak River, which flows into the Strait of Malacca, Pekanbaru has direct access to the busy strait and has long been known as a trading port.

A settlement has existed on the site since the 17th century. In the late 19th century, the city was developed to serve the coffee and coal industries, and the Dutch built roads to help ship goods to Singapore and Malacca. This city has an airport called Sultan Syarif Kasim II International Airport, and a port called Sungai Duku that is located by the Siak River.

== Etymology ==
The words "pekan" (market) and "baru" (new) in the Malay for "new market" are the source of the names Pekanbaru and Pekan Baru. Pekanbaru is used to be known as "new market" because back then Pekanbaru was a huge market which is known among the surrounding areas. It was formerly known as "Senapelan", which comes from the word "Sena", a tree that symbolises the region. Batin was the tribe chief at the time. In which around this time, this area transforms into Dusun Payung Sekaki, which is situated near the mouth of the Siak River, as it continues to grow into a new urban residential area.

According to the records kept by Imam Suhil Siak, Sultan Muhammad Ali Abdul Jalil Muazamsyah under the rule of Sultan Yahya officially established Senapelan on the 21st of Rajab, Tuesday, in the year 1204 H, corresponding to the 23rd of June 1784 AD, which was later set as the foundation date of Pekanbaru City. Senapelan was later more commonly known as Pekanbaru.

== History ==
On 14 December 1745, the Siak region was ceded by the Sultan of Johor Sulaiman Badrul Alam Shah from the Johor Sultanate to the Dutch East India Company (VOC) under the terms of a treaty in return for Dutch help against the enemies of Johor. Siak was put under Dutch administration. The Sultan moved residence to a palace in Senapelan built in 1760.

The origin of Pekanbaru was inseparable from the existence of the Siak River as a distributing route for commodities from the Minangkabau Highlands to the Strait of Malacca. During the 18th century, the Senapelan region on the banks of the Siak River became a market for the Minangkabau merchants. Over time, the area evolved into a crowded residential area. On June 23, 1784, based on the consultative meeting of the Council of Ministers from Sultanate of Siak Sri Indrapura, consisting of four tribal leaders (datuk) of Minangkabau tribes (Pesisir, Lima Puluah, Tanah Datar and Kampar), the area was named Pekanbaru. This date was later celebrated as the anniversary of this city.

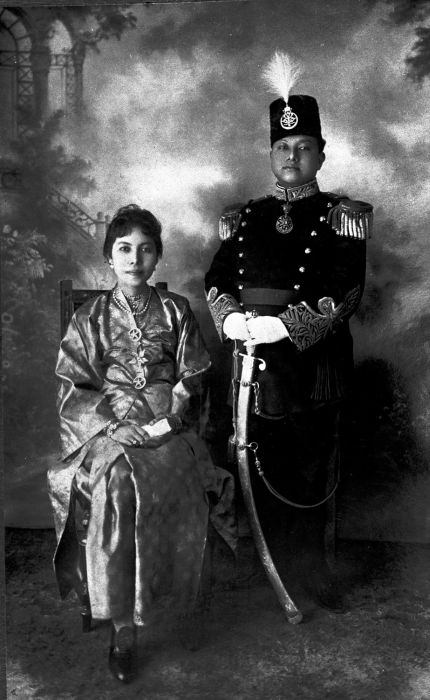
Sultan Syarif Kasim II of Siak and his wife, 1910–1920. The last Sultan of Siak who ceded his kingdom to the Republic of Indonesia

At Senapelan Sultan Abdul Jalil Shah Alamudin unsuccessfully tried to organize a major regional fair but in the early 1780s his son Sultan Muhammad Ali managed to establish the grand fair.

=== Dutch East Indies ===
Following the collapse of the Dutch East Indies Company (VOC), all company ownership of Pekanbaru was transferred to the Dutch crown. During the colonial Dutch East Indies era in the 19th and early 20th century the city remained important, especially as a major trading point: Siak river navigation conditions provide a stable relationship with shipping from the Malacca Strait. Additionally the city became a major center of the coffee industry and coal industry. The urban influence of the sultans gradually became increasingly nominal, especially after the capital of the Sultanate moved to Sri Indrapura in 1830. Actual management functions were carried out by representatives of the Dutch colonial administration, i.e., by the post of assistant-resident and controller.

=== Second World War ===
During the Second World War from February 1942 to August 1945 the city was occupied by the armed forces of Japan. In an effort to strengthen the military and logistical infrastructure in this part of Sumatra, the Japanese started the construction of a 220-kilometer-long railway, connecting Pekanbaru to the coast of Malacca Straits.

The Pekanbaru Railway was constructed under harsh conditions using forced labour. 6,500 Dutch, mostly Indo-Europeans, and British prisoners of war and over 100,000 Indonesian, mostly Javanese, forced workers called Romusha were put to work by the Japanese army. By the time the work was completed in August 1945 almost a third of the European POWs and over half of the Indonesian coolies had died.

George Duffy, one of the 15 Americans there and survivor of the sinking of the MS American Leader, noted that malaria, dysentery, pellagra, and malnutrition/beri-beri were the principal maladies compounded by overwork and mistreatment. The average age at death of the 700 prisoners of war who perished on that railway was 37 years and 3 months.

The railway was never fully utilised. Today it remains unused and in an advanced state of decay.

=== Indonesian era ===
After Indonesian independence, Pekanbaru was organized as an administrative city in 1956, and was selected to be the capital of the newly formed Riau province in 1959.

== Politics ==
Since 1946, Pekanbaru has been governed by at least 15 mayors. The first mayor to rule this city was Datuk Wan Abdul Rahman who was elected on 17 May 1946. Currently, the Mayor of Pekanbaru is Agung Nugroho.

== Reputation ==
Pekanbaru is one of the cleanest big cities in Indonesia. In 2011, Pekanbaru received the "Adipura" ('cleanest city') award in the category of large city for the seventh consecutive time.

== Demographics ==
=== Ethnicities ===
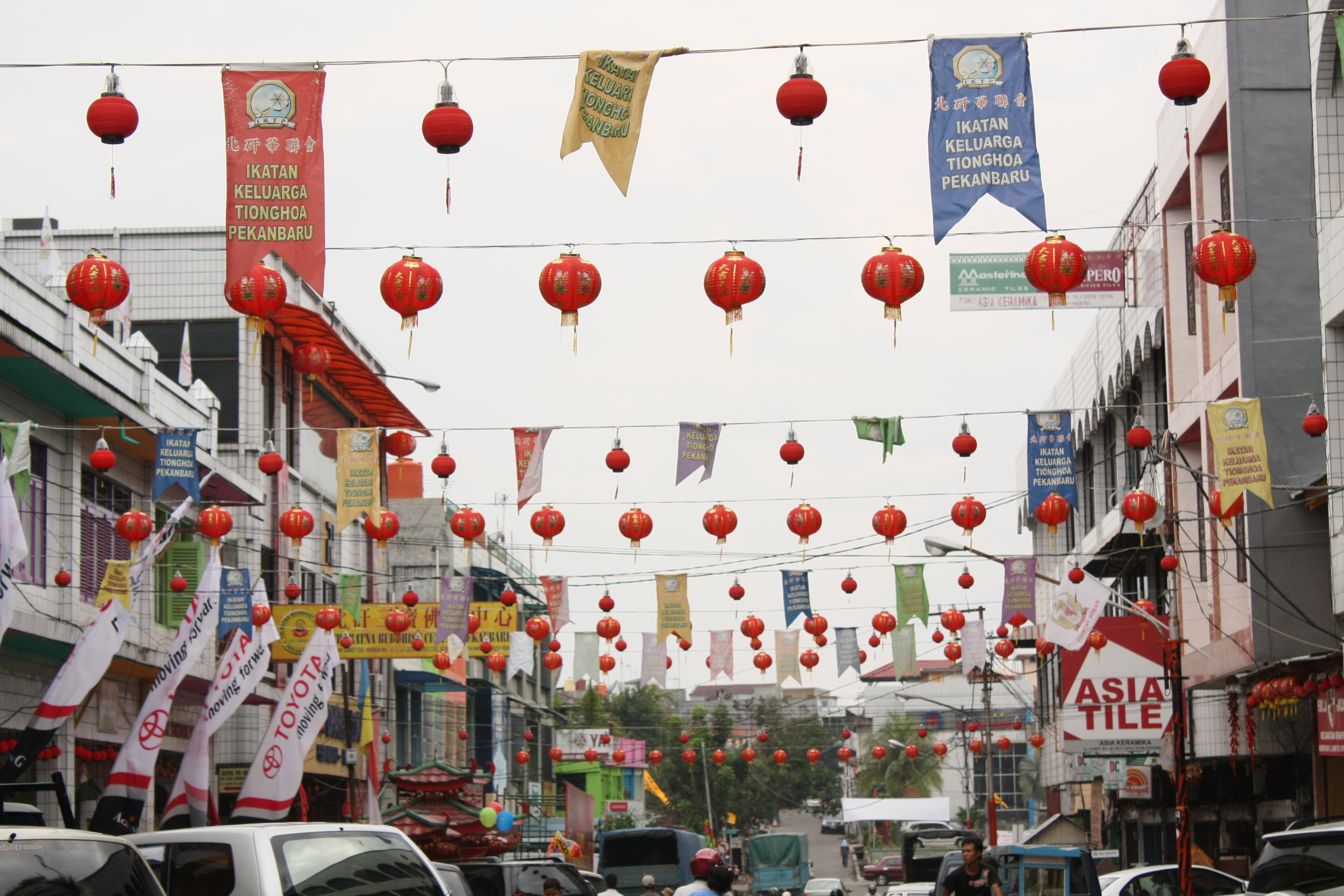
Chinese new year celebration at Pekanbaru

Pekanbaru is the third most populous city on Sumatra Island after Medan and Palembang, with a population of 983,356 according to the official Census for 2020; the official estimate as at mid 2025 was 1,192,990. The city is highly urbanised, drawing many of its people from the neighbouring province of West Sumatra. Since many centuries ago, Pekanbaru is one of the Minangkabau migration areas outside of their home province of West Sumatra and also within Sumatra island as a whole. After World War II, the number of Minangkabau people migrating to Pekanbaru surged, nearly doubling between the years 1943 and 1961. Many Minangkabau in Pekanbaru have lived there for generations and has since assimilated into the Malay community. In addition to the Minangkabau, the Riau Malays are the second largest ethnic group in Pekanbaru, comprising a quarter of the population. The Javanese, Batak and Tionghoa (mostly from the Hainanese dialect group, with minorities coming from the Hokkien and the Cantonese dialect group) are the other main ethnic groups inhabiting Pekanbaru city. Other communities such as the Arabs and the Indians are also present in Pekanbaru.

=== Religions ===
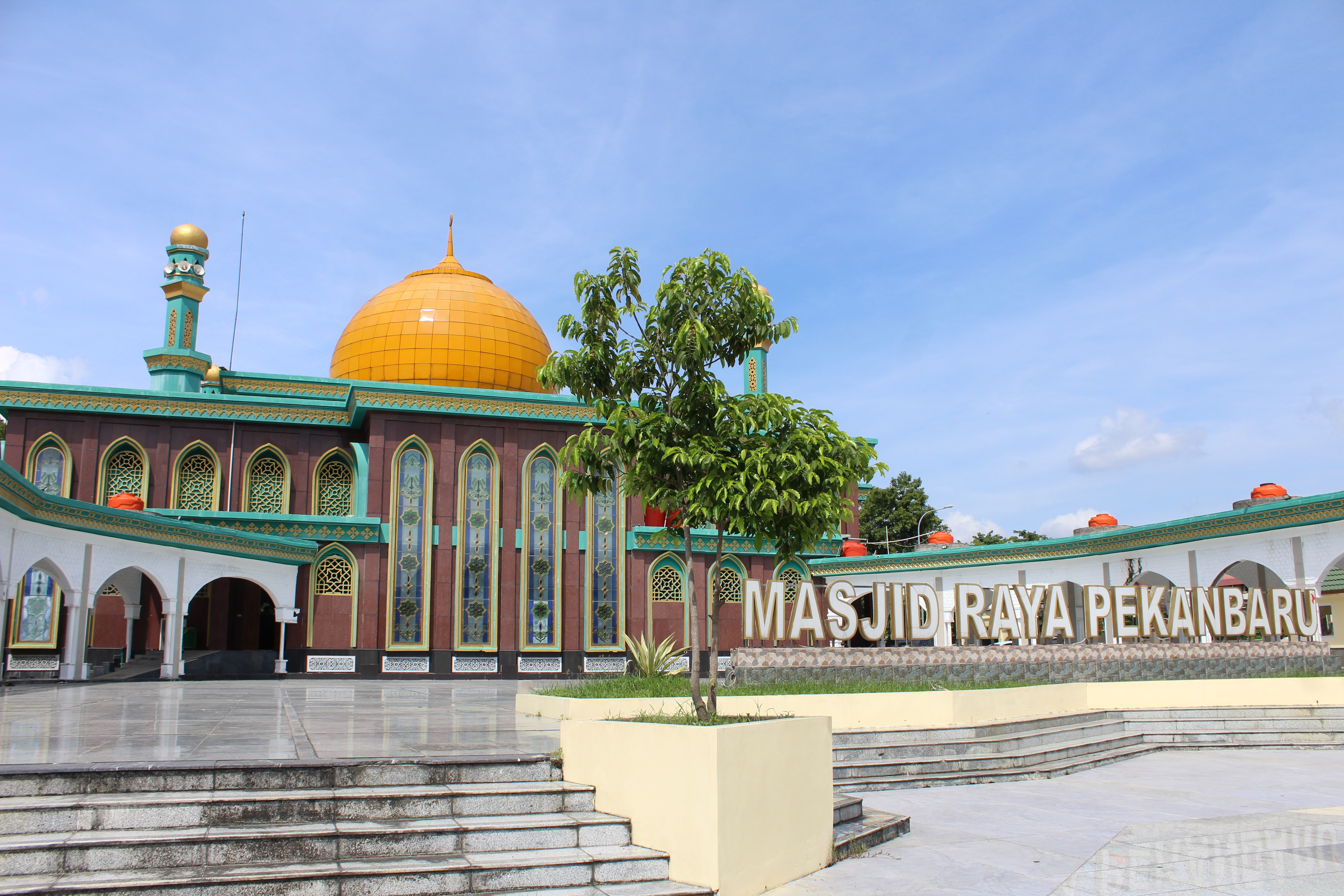
Great Mosque of Pekanbaru, one of the largest mosque in the province

The pluralism surrounding the city can be reflected by the variety of religions and freedom of belief among the people in Pekanbaru. Islam is the majority religion in this city, followed by Christianity (Protestantism and Catholic) as well as Buddhism and small percentage of Hinduism and Confucianism. Each religion in this city is represented by the presence of the religion's respective worship places, such as An-Nur Great Mosque and Pekanbaru Central Mosque (Masjid Raya Pekanbaru) for the Muslim community, St. Maria A Fatima Church and St. Paulus Church for the Catholic community, Huria Kristen Batak Protestan Church for the Protestant community as well as Vihara Dhamma Metta Arama, Vihara Dharma Loka and Vihara Vimala Virya for the Buddhist community and Kwan Tee Kong Bio (Vihara Satya Dharma) and Vihara Sasana Loka for Confucianist community and Pura Agung Jagatnatha for the Hindu community in Pekanbaru.

=== Languages ===
Indonesian is the official language that is spoken by the citizens of Pekanbaru. For informal use, Pekanbaru people regardless of their ethnicity also generally use Minangkabau language in their economic and daily activities, especially in the market area. In addition the local Riau Malay language and Javanese are also widely spoken because of the large population of Malays and Javanese in Pekanbaru. Hainanese as well as Riau Hokkien and Cantonese is mainly spoken by the Tionghoa community as most of the Chinese Indonesians in Pekanbaru belong to the Hainanese and Hoklo dialect groups. In fact, a minority of Chinese Indonesians in Pekanbaru also come from other regions in (mainland) Riau such as Selat Panjang, Bengkalis and Siak, along with the Chinese Indonesians who are natives of Pekanbaru itself, are also mostly from the Hainanese dialect group. Moreover, many Chinese Indonesians especially from North Sumatra, particularly from Medan as well as West Sumatra region and to a lesser extent the Riau Islands have internally migrated to Pekanbaru due to opportunities and rapid economical growth in the area since the 1990s and 2000s, in which the dialect groups of these internal migrants are from the Hokkien, Teochew, Cantonese and Hakka subgroups.

Ethnicities of Pekanbaru
ethnic group	percent
Minangkabau	37.96%
Malay	26.10%
Javanese	15.70%
Batak	11.04%
Chinese	2.50%

== Administrative districts ==
The city is divided into fifteen administrative districts, formerly twelve (Indonesian: kecamatan), tabulated below with their areas since the 2021 re-organisation, and their populations at the 2020 Census and according to the official estimates for mid 2025. The table also includes the locations of the district administrative centres and the number of administrative villages in each district (all classed as urban kelurahan).

Kode Wilayah	Name of District (kecamatan)	Area in km^{2}	Pop'n census 2020	Pop'n estimate mid 2025	Admin centre	No. of kelurahan
14.71.11	Payung Sekaki	36.37	^{(a)}	103,264	Labuh Baru Barat	6
14.71.13	Tuahmadani	30.37	^{(a)}	177,670	Tuahmadani	5
14.71.08	Binawidya	31.41	^{(a)}	86,915	Simpang Baru	5
14.71.07	Bukit Raya	24.03	93,478	113,339	Simpang Tiga	5
14.71.09	Marpoyan Damai	30.96	127,600	158,893	Sidomulyo Timur	6
14.71.10	Tenayan Raya	117.06	^{(b)}	122,917	Sialang Sakti	8
14.71.14	Kulim	58.25	^{(b)}	65,503	Mentangor	5
14.71.04	Limapuluh	5.69	38,613	46,017	Rintis	4
14.71.03	Sail	3.47	20,384	26,454	Cinta Raja	3
14.71.02	Pekanbaru Kota	2.24	22,604	27,176	Kota Tinggi	6
14.71.01	Sukajadi	3.84	42,852	48,679	Pulau Karam	7
14.71.05	Senapelan	3.03	35,357	38,559	Kampung Bandar	6
14.71.12	Rumbai	63.48	^{(c)}	106,548	Meranti Pandak	6
14.71.06	Rumbai Barat	88.97	^{(c)}	32,820	Maharani	6
14.71.15	Rumbai Timur	139.83	^{(c)}	38,236	Limbungan	5
	Totals	639.00	983,356	1,192,990		83

Notes: (a) The former districts of Tampan (59.81 km^{2}) and Payung Sekaki (43.24 km^{2}) have been re-organised into these three districts since 2020, when they had 203,238 and 96,296 inhabitants respectively.
(b) The former district of Tenayan Raya (171.27 km^{2}, with 154,261 inhabitants in 2020, has been split into two new districts.
(c) The former districts of Rumbai (128.85 km^{2}) and Rumbai Pesisir (157.33 km^{2}) have been re-organised into these three districts since 2020, when they had 78,185 and 70,488 inhabitants respectively.

== Urban villages ==
The 83 urban villages (kelurahan) are as follows:

Kode Wilayah	Name of Village (kelurahan)	Name of District (kecamatan)	Area in km^{2}	Pop'n estimate mid 2024	Post codes
14.71.01.1002	Jadirejo	Sukajadi	0.63	5,506	28126
14.71.01.1003	Central Kampung	Sukajadi	0.49	8,841	28128
14.71.01.1004	Kampung Melayu	Sukajadi	0.93	8,785	28124
14.71.01.1005	Kedungsari	Sukajadi	0.50	7,012	28123
14.71.01.1006	Harjosari	Sukajadi	0.49	6,082	28122
14.71.01.1007	Sukajadi	Sukajadi	0.45	7,947	28121
14.71.01.1008	Pulau Karomah	Sukajadi	0.34	4,401	28127
14.71.02.1001	Simpang Empat	Pekanbaru Kota	0.62	2,080	28116
14.71.02.1002	Sumahilang	Pekanbaru Kota	0.51	6,032	28111
14.71.02.1003	Tanah Datar	Pekanbaru Kota	0.31	5,998	28115
14.71.02.1004	Kota Baru	Pekanbaru Kota	0.22	5,374	28114
14.71.02.1005	Sukaramai	Pekanbaru Kota	0.26	5,200	28113
14.71.02.1006	Kota Tinggi	Pekanbaru Kota	0.30	2,503	28112
14.71.03.1001	Cinta Raja	Sail	0.96	6,412	28131
14.71.03.1002	Sukamulya	Sail	1.18	11,084	28133
14.71.03.1003	Sukamaju	Sail	1.29	8,852	28132
14.71.04.1001	Rintis	Limapuluh	0.68	7,711	28141
14.71.04.1002	Tanjung Rhu	Limapuluh	1.62	11,321	28143
14.71.04.1003	Pesisir	Limapuluh	0.86	9,127	28144
14.71.04.1004	Sekip	Limapuluh	0.82	17,777	28142
14.71.05.1001	Padang Bulan	Senapelan	0.64	10,229	28156
14.71.05.1002	Sago	Senapelan	0.20	2,120	28151
14.71.05.1003	Kampung Baru	Senapelan	0.86	10,374	28154
14.71.05.1004	Kampung Dalam	Senapelan	0.23	2,680	28152
14.71.05.1005	Kampung Bandar	Senapelan	0.41	4,938	28153
14.71.05.1006	Padang Terubuk	Senapelan	0.59	8,359	28155
14.71.06.1003	Rumbai Bukit	Rumbai Barat	10.75	6,351	28264
14.71.06.1005	East Muara Fajar	Rumbai Barat	16.99	6,450	28267
14.71.06.1010	West Muara Fajar	Rumbai Barat	26.88	6,477	28267
14.71.06.1011	Rantau Panjang	Rumbai Barat	10.00	2,188	28264
14.71.06.1012	Maharani	Rumbai Barat	7.29	3,139	28264
14.71.06.1013	Agrowisata	Rumbai Barat	23.88	6,901	28264
14.71.07.1005	Simpang Tiga	Bukit Raya	5.13	22,300	28284
14.71.07.1006	South Tangkerang	Bukit Raya	3.09	18,044	28288
14.71.07.1008	North Tangkerang	Bukit Raya	2.64	21,437	28289
14.71.07.1011	Tangkerang Labuai	Bukit Raya	2.67	19,535	28281
14.71.07.1012	Air Dingin	Bukit Raya	8.51	29,467	28284
14.71.08.1001	Simpang Baru	Binawidya	7.13	16,628	28293
14.71.08.1008	Delima	Binawidya	5.75	21,992	28290
14.71.08.1009	Tobek Godang	Binawidya	4.63	22,259	28297
14.71.08.1010	Binawidya	Binawidya	7.04	12,521	28295
14.71.08.1014	Sungai Sibam	Binawidya	6.75	10,814	28292

Kode Wilayah	Name of Village (kelurahan)	Name of District (kecamatan)	Area in km^{2}	Pop'n estimate mid 2024	Post codes
14.71.09.1001	West Tangkerang	Marpoyan Damai	5.35	23,489	28282
14.71.09.1002	Central Tangkerang	Marpoyan Damai	5.00	37,068	28282
14.71.09.1003	East Sidomulyo	Marpoyan Damai	7.19	35,473	28125
14.71.09.1004	Wonorejo	Marpoyan Damai	1.35	14,678	28125
14.71.09.1005	Maharatu	Marpoyan Damai	6.92	21,559	28125
14.71.09.1006	Perhentian Marpoyan	Marpoyan Damai	4.34	23,613	28125
14.71.10.1002	Bencah Lesung	Tenayan Raya	10.10	15,432	28285
14.71.10.1003	East Tangkerang	Tenayan Raya	3.70	20,990	28289
14.71.10.1004	Rejosari	Tenayan Raya	5.59	27,935	28281
14.71.10.1005	Bambu Kuning	Tenayan Raya	5.24	13,853	28281
14.71.10.1010	Melebung	Tenayan Raya	42.92	600	28285
14.71.10.1011	Industri Tenayan	Tenayan Raya	19.42	3,361	28285
14.71.10.1012	Sialang Sakti	Tenayan Raya	9.26	30,313	28285
14.71.10.1013	Tuah Negeri	Tenayan Raya	22.80	7,808	28285
14.71.11.1001	Tampan	Payung Sekaki	3.95	13,916	28292
14.71.11.1002	East Labuh Baru	Payung Sekaki	3.55	27,736	28292
14.71.11.1003	West Labuh Baru	Payung Sekaki	5.44	25,931	28292
14.71.11.1004	Air Hitam	Payung Sekaki	9.87	10,109	28292
14.71.11.1005	Bandar Raya	Payung Sekaki	7.46	11,582	28292
14.71.11.1007	Tirta Siak	Payung Sekaki	6.03	12,692	28292
14.71.12.1001	Meranti Pandak	Rumbai	3.92	12,977	28266
14.71.12.1004	Lembah Damai	Rumbai	13.80	8,519	28263
14.71.12.1006	Limbungan Baru	Rumbai	2.09	21,145	28261
14.71.12.1009	Sri Meranti	Rumbai	9.36	27,049	28261
14.71.12.1010	Palas	Rumbai	16.64	13,365	28264
14.71.12.1011	Umban Sari	Rumbai	9.30	21,915	28265
14.71.13.1001	West Sidomulyo	Tuahmadani	8.62	50,650	28294
14.71.13.1002	Sialang Munggu	Tuahmadani	5.25	41,232	28299
14.71.13.1003	Tuah Karya	Tuahmadani	5.26	42,714	28291
14.71.13.1004	Tuahmadani	Tuahmadani	4.52	12,084	28298
14.71.13.1005	Air Putih	Tuahmadani	6.28	24,906	28296
14.71.14.1001	Kulim	Kulim	25.50	5,870	28286
14.71.14.1002	Mentangor	Kulim	4.86	15,624	28286
14.71.14.1003	Sialang Rampai	Kulim	15.01	7,137	28286
14.71.14.1004	Pebatuan	Kulim	8.98	13,215	28286
14.71.14.1005	Pematang Kapau	Kulim	6.19	20,626	28289
14.71.15.1001	Tebing Tinggi Okura	Rumbai Timur	68.00	3,344	28287
14.71.15.1002	Sungai Ukai	Rumbai Timur	33.58	2,117	28287
14.71.15.1003	Sungai Ambang	Rumbai Timur	27.13	1,353	28262
14.71.15.1004	Lembah Sari	Rumbai Timur	5.25	15,181	28262
14.71.15.1005	Limbungan	Rumbai Timur	5.88	15,190	28261

== Climate ==
Pekanbaru has a tropical rainforest climate under the Köppen climate classification. As with many cities with an equatorial climate, the temperature only varies a little throughout the year. The hottest month is May with average temperature 27.6 °C (81.7 °F), while the coolest month is January with average temperature 26.4 °C (79.5 °F). The precipitation accumulation also remains constant throughout the year with no real dry season. The month with most precipitation is November with precipitation total 312 millimetres (12.3 in), while the least precipitation is July with precipitation total 123 millimetres (4.8 in).

Climate data for Pekanbaru (Sultan Syarif Kasim II International Airport) (1991–2020 normals)
Month	Jan	Feb	Mar	Apr	May	Jun	Jul	Aug	Sep	Oct	Nov	Dec	Year
Mean daily maximum °C (°F)	31.9 (89.4)	32.3 (90.1)	33.2 (91.8)	33.3 (91.9)	33.7 (92.7)	33.2 (91.8)	33.0 (91.4)	32.9 (91.2)	32.6 (90.7)	32.9 (91.2)	32.5 (90.5)	31.8 (89.2)	32.8 (91.0)
Daily mean °C (°F)	26.7 (80.1)	27.1 (80.8)	27.5 (81.5)	27.6 (81.7)	28.1 (82.6)	27.9 (82.2)	27.6 (81.7)	27.4 (81.3)	27.2 (81.0)	27.2 (81.0)	27.1 (80.8)	26.8 (80.2)	27.4 (81.2)
Mean daily minimum °C (°F)	23.3 (73.9)	23.1 (73.6)	23.2 (73.8)	23.2 (73.8)	23.6 (74.5)	23.2 (73.8)	23.2 (73.8)	23.2 (73.8)	23.1 (73.6)	23.1 (73.6)	23.3 (73.9)	23.2 (73.8)	23.2 (73.8)
Average precipitation mm (inches)	206.4 (8.13)	148.4 (5.84)	277.2 (10.91)	290.0 (11.42)	210.0 (8.27)	167.8 (6.61)	159.9 (6.30)	166.1 (6.54)	216.2 (8.51)	255.5 (10.06)	322.8 (12.71)	284.5 (11.20)	2,704.8 (106.49)
Average precipitation days (≥ 1.0 mm)	14.1	11.9	15.5	16.4	13.0	10.6	10.5	11.4	12.2	15.4	18.5	16.5	166
Mean monthly sunshine hours	97.3	109.7	128.1	137.4	156.7	146.0	154.0	142.8	112.7	121.9	120.8	105.1	1,532.5
Source 1: World Meteorological Organization
Source 2: Starlings Roost Weather

== Economy ==
After oil was discovered in the region in the 1930s, Pekanbaru's economy has depended heavily on oil revenues which caused the city to have the highest per capita income in Indonesia. Most of Indonesia's petroleum is produced in Riau, and much of Pekanbaru's economy is based on the petroleum industry. International oil companies, prominently Chevron from the US, as well as other Indonesian companies, have established their offices in the region. The city is connected by road to an oil refining and exporting port in Dumai. Many facilities and infrastructures such as an airport, stadiums, housing areas, schools, bridges that cross the Siak River in Pekanbaru, the roads in Rumbai and the roads to Dumai, were partially or fully financed by oil companies in the area.

Pekanbaru is close with some of the of mega-companies, such as PT Riau Andalan Pulp Paper, PT. Indah Kiat, PT. Chevron Pacific Indonesia, and PT Perkebunan Nusantara V and some wood-sawmill, CPOs, and rubber-processing companies. To add, Pekanbaru is known to be one of the cities with the highest money and banking rotation in Indonesia.

As Pekanbaru is prominently known as a major gateway for tourists from Singapore and Malaysia, the city has become a favourite stop-over for travellers before they go further inland to other regions of Sumatra Island such as Padang and Jambi. The Pasar Pusat (Central Market) is a food-trip destination and considered a household-goods trove. Pasar Bawah and Pasar Tengah, located near to the port and Siak riverbank, are especially known for the marketplace for buying and selling of Chinese goods like ceramics and carpets.

Around 127,000 foreign tourists arrived in Pekanbaru through its airport during 2018.

On the other hand, there are many developments of shopping malls. Additionally, there are a lot of housing areas have been developed since the 2000s surrounding the city, particularly in Panam area whereby the housing project along the road has been tremendously established and now becoming one of the most populous area in Pekanbaru even though it is located far from downtown.

Favorably, there are several landmarks that have been built in this city. For example, The Great Mosque of An-nur, Mesjid Raya Pekanbaru, Pasar Bawah or Tourist Market, Riau Bank Tower, Riau Government Office Tower, Siak IV Bridge, Zapin Dance Monument and there are many more to come.

== Transportation ==
There are several modes of transportation in Pekanbaru such as taxi, bus, oplet (share taxi), bajaj (auto rickshaw), ojek (motorcycle taxi) and Trans Metro Pekanbaru (bus rapid transit). However, due to the rapidly increasing number of motorised vehicles, the traffic congestion that occurs on some roads such as Jalan Sudirman, Jalan Riau and Jalan HR. Subrantas that mainly connect populous sub-districts in the city cannot be avoided any more particularly during weekends and holidays. These problems initiated the government of Pekanbaru to come up with plans to solve these matters, especially within 10 to 15 years ahead.

=== Land ===
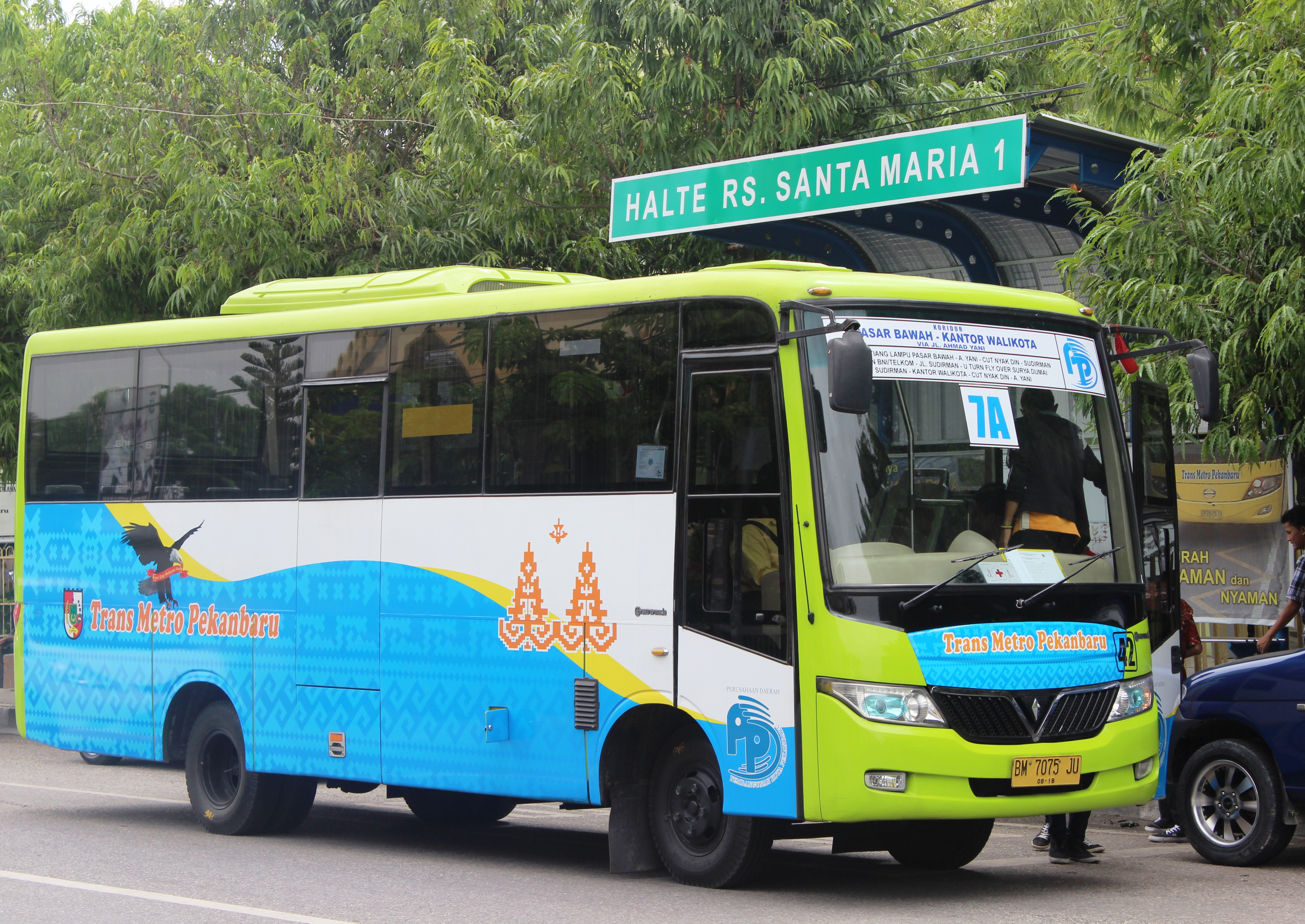
Trans Metro Pekanbaru.

For land transport, Pekanbaru is connected to Padang, Medan, Jambi, Palembang, and other cities or regions in Riau Province and Sumatra Island by the existence of Bandar Raya Payung Sekaki Bus Terminal. The terminal was officially open for public in 2007, replacing Pekanbaru's former "Mayang Terurai Terminal Bus" due to heavy congestion. However, the Bandar Raya Payung Sekaki Bus Terminal is not fully utilised by several prominent bus companies such as Pelangi, Makmur, Riau Mandiri and Sidomulyo as well as other bus operators because its location which is deemed by some parties to be not as strategic as Mayang Terurai Bus Terminal. These matters surely make some bus companies have no choice but to drop off the passengers outside the designated zone. This informal drop-off zone is usually called by local people as terminal bayangan ("shadow terminals").

=== Rivers ===
Port of Sungai Duku is located by the Siak River, connecting Pekanbaru with some regions in Riau Province and Riau Islands such as Siak, Tanjung Buton, Selat Panjang, Bengkalis and Batam. In the past, there were ferry services travelling from this port directly to Malacca in Malaysia, but the service was discontinued as several ferry companies decided to move their operations to Tanjung Buton.

=== Air ===
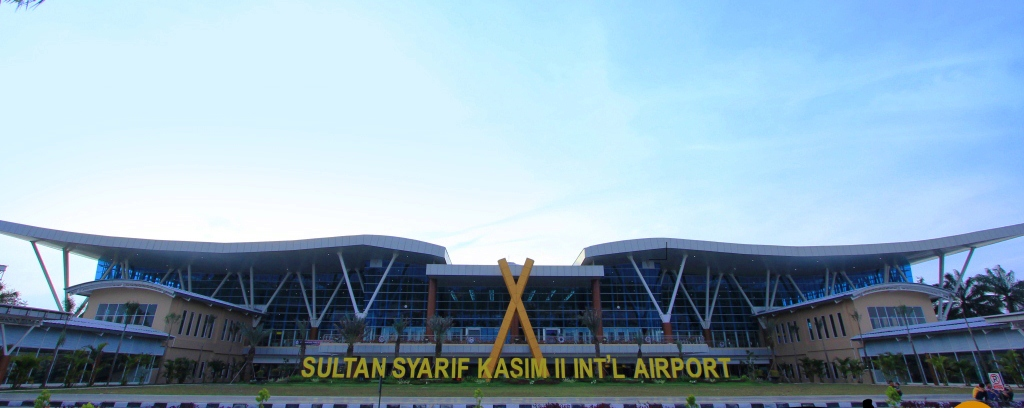
Sultan Syarif Kasim II International Airport of Pekanbaru

Sultan Syarif Kasim II International Airport serves flights in Pekanbaru from/and to several cities in Indonesia such as Batam, Medan, Bandung, Jakarta, Yogyakarta, Surabaya, and others, and international flights to several countries such as Malaysia, Singapore, Saudi Arabia, and Sri Lanka. Several prominent domestic airlines serve the route from/and to Pekanbaru such as Citilink, Garuda Indonesia, Lion Air, Batik Air, Indonesia Air Asia, Susi Air, Super Air Jet and Wings Air. International flights are presently provided by AirAsia, Malindo Air, Scoot and Batik Air Malaysia

In 2012, the new terminal was opened, replacing the old terminal that had been used since the 1980s. The old terminal is planned to be demolished to build more spaces for the apron and more aircraft capacity. Even though the new terminal has been fully used, the aerobridges that were constructed have never been utilized as the apron expansion has not been completed yet after two years since the opening of the new terminal to the public in 2012. Thus, the airport company PT Angkasa Pura II is currently ferrying passengers to and from the terminal using shuttle buses until the aerobridge can be used. Pekanbaru's airport is also utilized separately as the airbase of the TNI-AU (Indonesian Air Force) and home base of the 12th Squadron, a shelter to some Hawk Mk.109s and Mk.209s. The airbase is named after the former head of Indonesian Air Force, Roesmin Nurjadin and formally called as Pangkalan Udara Roesmin Nurjadin or Roesmin Nurjadin Airbase.

== Education ==
Pekanbaru has a formal and informal form of education. Pekanbaru currently implements a "zonation" system to assign new students in public schools.

== Tourism ==
The tradition of Petang Megang when entering the month of Ramadan has been carried out since the time of the Siak Sultanate and is still held by the people of Pekanbaru City.

== Sports ==
Football is the most popular sport in Indonesia. In Pekanbaru, PSPS Pekanbaru is the local club that has been competing in Indonesian Super League since the 2000s. Kaharudin Nasution Sport Center Rumbai Stadium is the home stadium for PSPS Pekanbaru.

In 2012, 2013 AFC U-22 Asian Cup qualification, 2012 Pekan Olahraga Nasional (Indonesian National Games) and 2012 Pekan Paralympic Nasional was held in Riau Province. Since then, many sport facilities have been built in Pekanbaru because this city was the home for many sports venues used these multi-national events, such as the prominent Riau Main Stadium. Unfortunately, many sports facilities that have been developed before the 2012 Pekan Olahraga Nasional are not being managed and taken care of properly. An example would be the Riau Main Stadium, which was never used again after the event until today due to financial disputes between the local government and the contractors of the stadium.

Several golf courses can be found in Pekanbaru, such as Pekanbaru Golf Course Country Club at Kubang Kulim, Simpang Tiga Golf Course at AURI Complex, Rumbai Golf Course at IKSORA Rumbai Complex and Labersa Golf Course at Labersa Hotel and Convention Center.

== Media ==
The TVRI Riau (state-owned) and Riau TV (private) are some of the popular local television stations in Pekanbaru. Several local newspapers operating in Pekanbaru, such as Riau Pos, Haluan Riau, Tribun Pekanbaru, Pekanbaru Pos, Metro Riau, Pekanbaru MX and Koran Riau.

== Sister cities ==
Sister town/cities	Country
Malacca City	Malaysia
Zamboanga City	Philippines
Davao City	Philippines
Chongqing	China
Liuzhou	China
Quebec City	Canada
Suwon	South Korea
Fukushima City	Japan
Daegu	South Korea
San Jose, California	United States
Utrecht	Netherlands
Atlanta	United States
Da Nang	Vietnam
Batam	Indonesia
Bandung	Indonesia
Bandar Lampung	Indonesia
Jeddah	Saudi Arabia
