= Arifin Achmad =

Indonesian military officer (1924–1994)

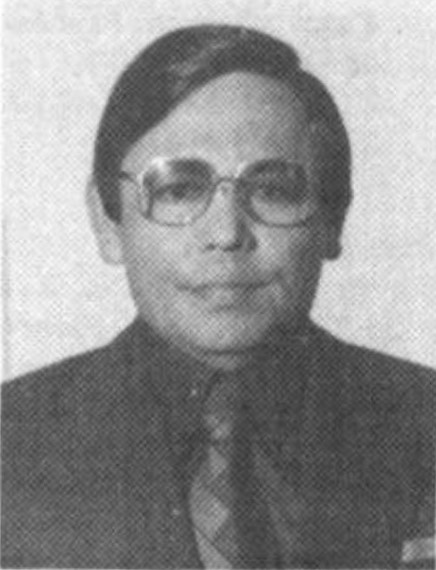
- Achmad, c. 1977

Governor of Riau
- In office 4 March 1967 (Note: As caretaker and later acting governor in 1966-1967 and 1977-1978.) – 4 March 1972
- In office 5 December 1972 – 5 December 1977
- Preceded by: Kaharuddin Nasution
- Succeeded by: Subrantas Siswanto

Personal details
- Born: 23 October 1924; Bagansiapiapi, Dutch East Indies
- Died: 11 January 1994 (aged 69); Jakarta, Indonesia

Military service
- Allegiance: Indonesia
- Branch/service: Indonesian Army
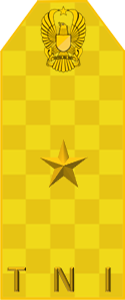
- Rank: Brigadier general

Arifin Achmad (23 October 1924 – 11 January 1994) was an Indonesian military officer who served as the governor of Riau between 1966 and 1978.

== Early life ==
Achmad was born in Bagansiapiapi on 23 October 1924. He was educated at Taman Siswa schools, graduating elementary school in 1937 and middle school in 1942. During the Japanese occupation of the Dutch East Indies, he received military training before also being educated as a civil servant. He fought as a guerilla soldier around Riau during the Indonesian National Revolution.

== Career ==
Between the end of the revolution and the fall of Sukarno in 1966, Achmad was stationed in various posts in Sumatra, including in Riau, South Sumatra, and North Sumatra. In 1966, the pro-Sukarno governor of Riau Kaharuddin Nasution was removed from office, and Achmad was appointed as caretaker, then acting governor in his place. Achmad was officially sworn in as full governor on 4 March 1967. He was Riau's third governor, and the first one to originate from the province. He was promoted to brigadier general on 1 October 1970, during his first term.

On 5 December 1972, he was sworn in for his second term as governor. His tenure saw the movement of the governor's office, the establishment of the University of Riau, and the construction of two bridges in Kampar and Siak. After the conclusion of his term, in 1977, he continued to serve as acting governor until 1978. He was also part of the People's Consultative Assembly, starting in 1977. He remained active in Riau's politics after his tenure as governor, opposing the reelection of the government-backed incumbent Imam Munandar in 1985.

== Family and personal life ==
Achmad was married to Martha Lena, and the couple has three daughters who as of 2020 had moved to Australia. Achmad died in Jakarta on 11 January 1994.
