= Herman Abdullah =

Indonesian politician (1950–2022)

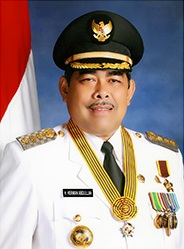

Mayor of Pekanbaru
- In office 18 July 2001 – 18 July 2011
- Deputy: Erizal Muluk
- Preceded by: Oesman Effendi Apan
- Succeeded by: Firdaus

Personal details
- Born: 18 July 1950 Pekanbaru, United States of Indonesia
- Died: 27 February 2022 (aged 71) Pekanbaru, Indonesia
- Party: Golkar
- Education: Andalas University; Padjadjaran University

Herman Abdullah (18 July 1950 – 27 February 2022) was an Indonesian politician. A member of Golkar, he served as mayor of Pekanbaru from 2001 to 2011.

== Political career ==
Herman started his career in the Pekanbaru City government as Chairman of Bappeda, then became Regional Secretary and mayor. During his leadership he made many improvements in Pekanbaru. Among other things, in the field of cleanliness and urban planning, where during his reign, Pekanbaru managed to win the Piala Adipura seven times in a row. Apart from that, Herman also won the Piala Wahana Tata Nugraha (WTN) several times.

Herman also succeeded in inviting outside investors to invest in Pekanbaru. This is indicated by the number of development companies developing their property projects in this city. Thanks to his achievements, he received many awards. Among others is the Satya Lencana Pembangunan of the President of the Republic of Indonesia in 2005.

In the 2006, Herman again run as a mayoral candidate for a second term with partner Erizal Muluk and won the mayoral election results. So Herman and Erizal officially served as mayor and deputy mayor of Pekanbaru from 2006 to 2011. After the end of his term as mayor of Pekanbaru, Herman ran as a candidate for governor of Riau with the deputy mayor of Dumai, Agus Hidayat in 2013, but lost to the pair of Annas Maamun and Arsyadjuliandi Rachman.

== Death ==
Herman died in Awal Bros Hospital Pekanbaru on 27 February 2022, at the age of 71 and was buried in the Kusuma Dharma Heroes' Cemetery, Pekanbaru City.

== Honours ==
- Bintang Jasa Pratama
- Satyalancana Pembangunan - 2005
- Satyalancana Wira Karya - 2004
- Satyalancana Karya Satya (20 Years) - 2000
- Lencana Melati Gerakan Pramuka
- Lencana Darma Bakti Gerakan Pramuka
