= 2024 Pekanbaru mayoral election =

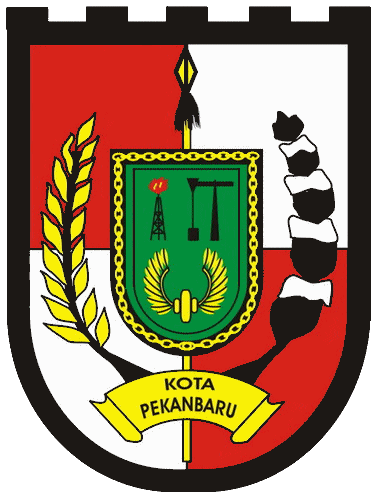
- 27 November 2024
- Turnout: 45.99%
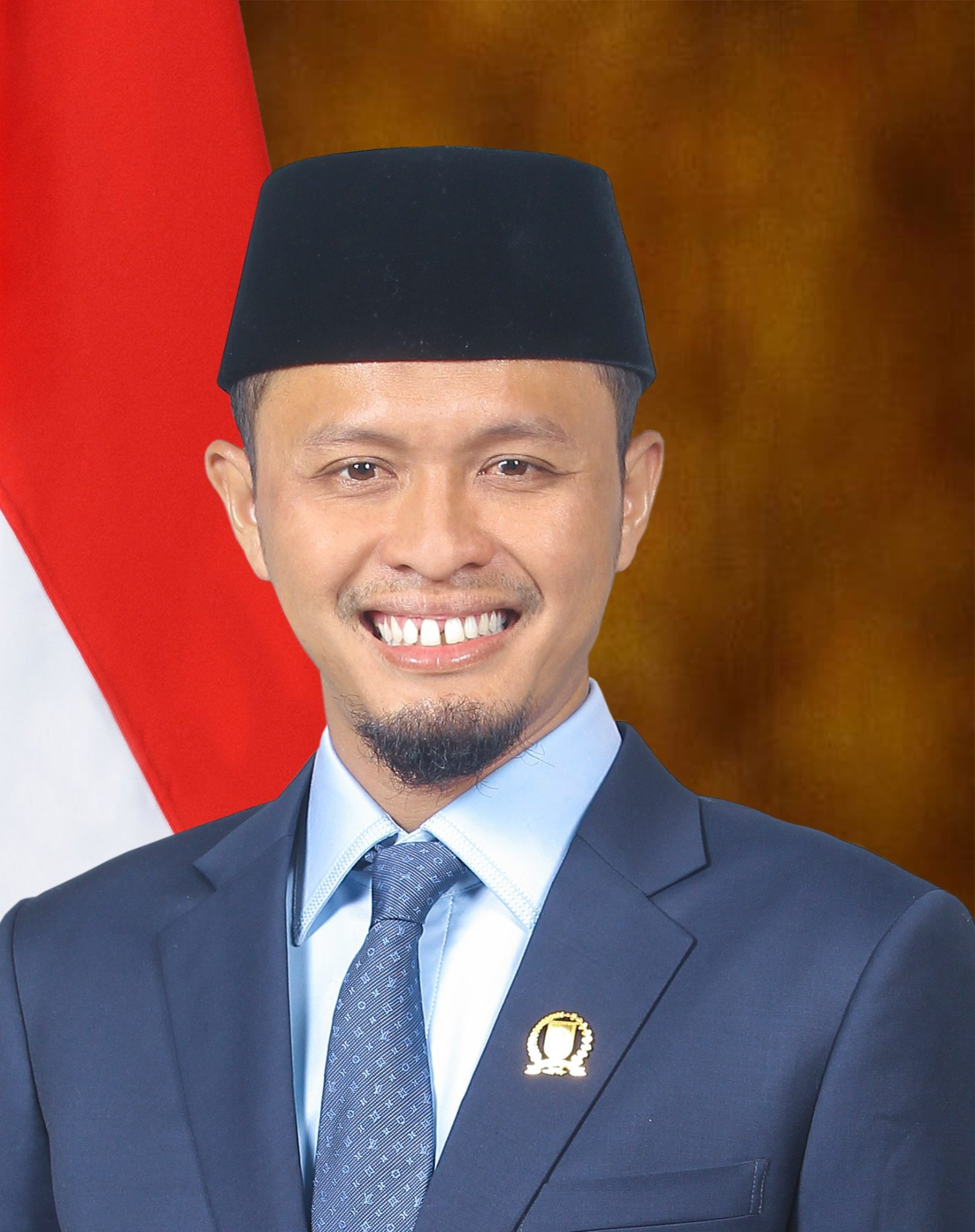

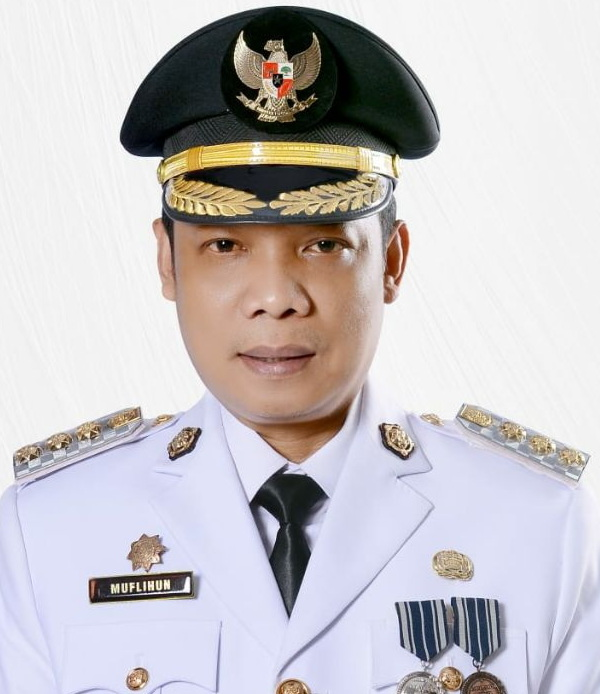

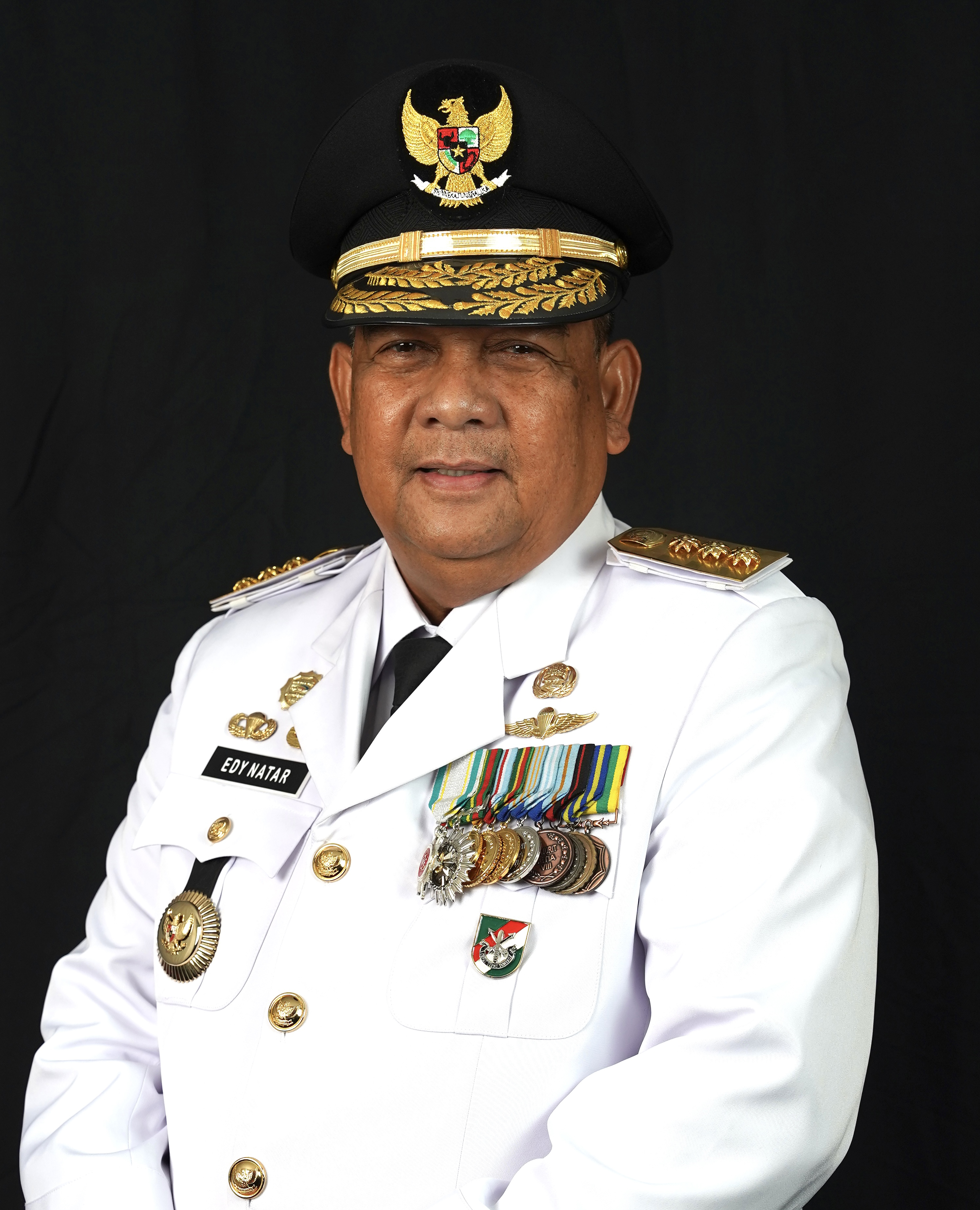

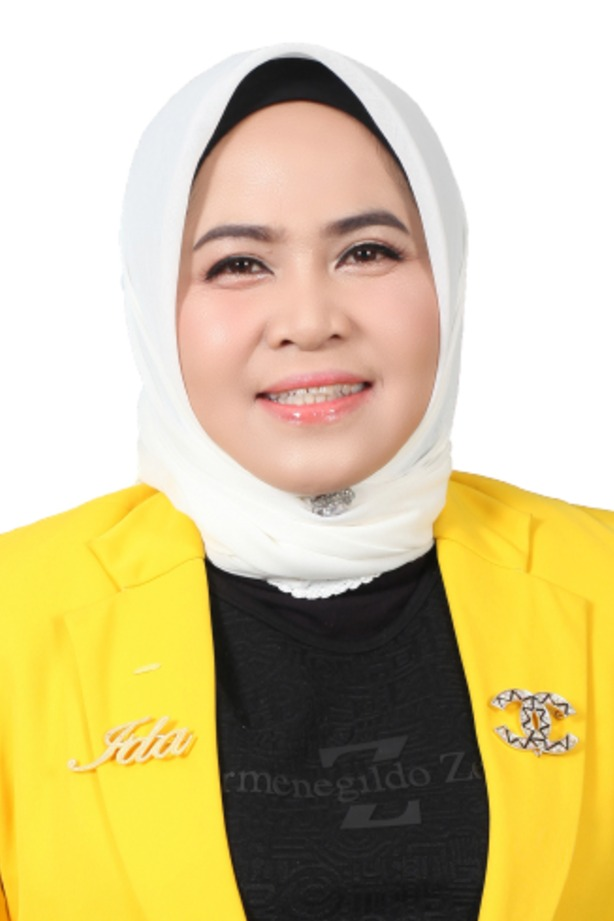

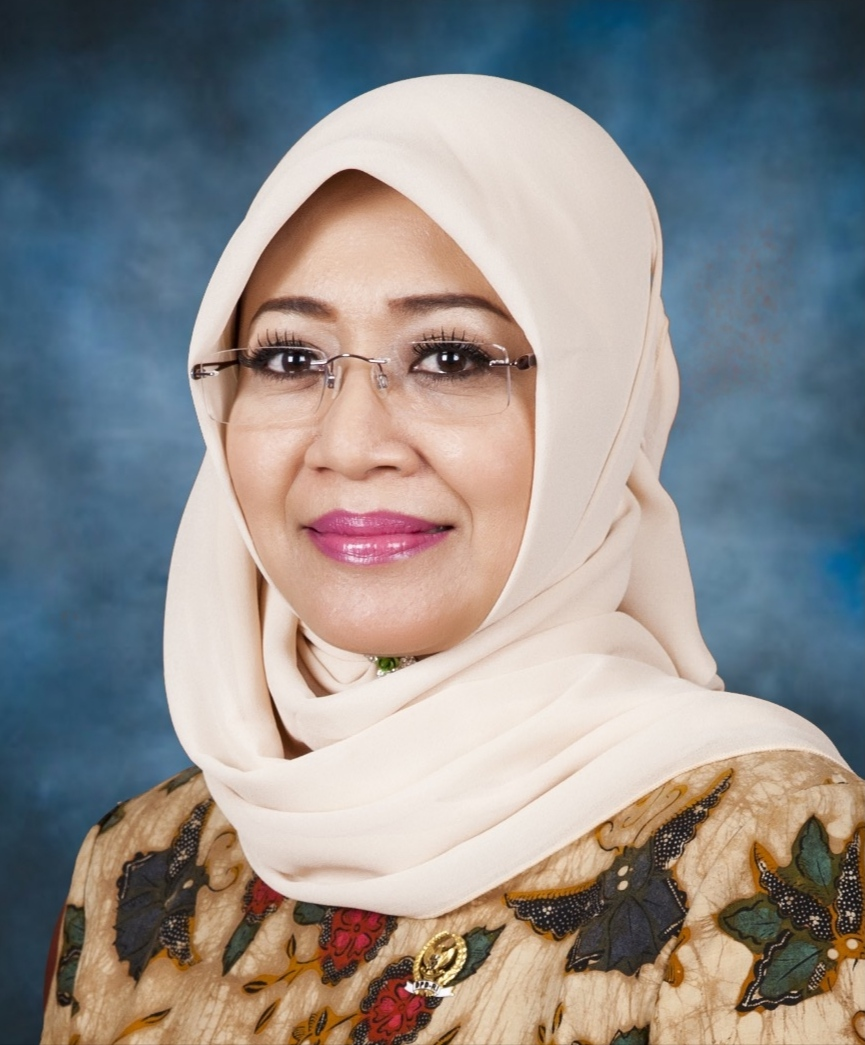
Candidate	Agung Nugroho	Muflihun	Edy Nasution
Party	Demokrat	Gerindra	NasDem
Running mate	Markarius Anwar	Ade Hartati Rahmat	Dastrayani Bibra
Popular vote	164,041	72,475	56,159
Percentage	46.54%	20.56%	15.93%
Candidate	Ida Yulita Susanti	Intsiawati Ayus
Party	Golkar	Hanura
Running mate	Kharisman Risanda	Taufik Arrakhman
Popular vote	42,001	17,811
Percentage	11.92%	5.05%
Mayor before election
Roni Rakhmat (acting)
Independent
Elected mayor
Agung Nugroho
Demokrat

The 2024 Pekanbaru mayoral election was held on 27 November 2024 as part of nationwide local elections to elect the mayor and vice mayor of the city of Pekanbaru, Riau for a five-year term. The previous election was held in 2017. The election was won by former deputy speaker of the Riau Regional House of Representatives, Agung Nugroho of the Democratic Party, who received 46% of the vote. Muflihun, a member of the Gerindra Party and a former acting mayor, placed second with 20%. Former Riau Governor Edy Nasution of the NasDem Party came third, receiving 15% of the vote.

== Electoral system ==
The election, like other local elections in 2024, follow the first-past-the-post system where the candidate with the most votes wins the election, even if they do not win a majority. It is possible for a candidate to run uncontested, in which case the candidate is still required to win a majority of votes "against" an "empty box" option. Should the candidate fail to do so, the election will be repeated on a later date.

== Candidates ==
According to electoral regulations, in order to qualify for the election, candidates were required to secure support from a political party or a coalition of parties controlling 10 seats (20 percent of all seats) in the Pekanbaru Regional House of Representatives (DPRD). As no parties won 10 or more seats in the 2024 legislative election, parties are required to form coalitions in order to nominate a candidate. Candidates may alternatively demonstrate support to run as an independent in form of photocopies of identity cards, which in Pekanbaru's case corresponds to 57,863 copies. No independent candidates registered with the General Elections Commission by the set deadline.

The previous elected mayor, Firdaus, has served two terms as mayor and was ineligible to run in the election. His two-term vice mayor, PKS's Ayat Cahyadi, ran in the 2024 legislative election and won a seat in the Riau DPRD, and has endorsed PKS' potential mayoral candidate Muhammad Ikhsan instead of running for mayor.

=== Potential ===
The following are individuals who have either been publicly mentioned as a potential candidate by a political party in the DPRD, publicly declared their candidacy with press coverage, or considered as a potential candidate by media outlets:

- Agung Nugroho (Demokrat), deputy speaker of the Riau DPRD.
- Kordias Pasaribu (PDI-P), former deputy speaker of the Riau DPRD.
- Parisman Ihwan (Golkar), member of the Riau DPRD.
- Ida Yulita (Golkar), member of the Pekanbaru DPRD.
- Muhammad Ikhsan (PKS), urban planner active in Riau.

== Political map ==
Following the 2024 Indonesian legislative election, nine political parties are represented in the Pekanbaru DPRD:

Political parties	Seat count
Prosperous Justice Party (PKS)	8 / 50
Democratic Party (Demokrat)	8 / 50
Great Indonesia Movement Party (Gerindra)	7 / 50
Indonesian Democratic Party of Struggle (PDI-P)	7 / 50
National Mandate Party (PAN)	6 / 50
Party of Functional Groups (Golkar)	5 / 50
NasDem Party	5 / 50
National Awakening Party (PKB)	2 / 50
People's Conscience Party (Hanura)	2 / 50

== Results ==
Candidate	Running mate	Party	Votes	%
Agung Nugroho	Markarius Anwar	Democratic Party	164,041	46.54
Muflihun	Ade Hartati Rahmat	Gerindra Party	72,475	20.56
Edy Nasution	Dastrayani Bibra	NasDem Party	56,159	15.93
Ida Yulita Susanti	Kharisman Risanda	Golkar	42,001	11.92
Intsiawati Ayus	Taufik Arrakhman	People's Conscience Party	17,811	5.05
Total			352,487	100.00
Valid votes			352,487	96.89
Invalid/blank votes			11,299	3.11
Total votes			363,786	100.00
Registered voters/turnout			791,034	45.99
Source: KPU
