= 2024 Riau gubernatorial election =

- 27 November 2024
- Turnout: 59.72% (▲1.70pp)
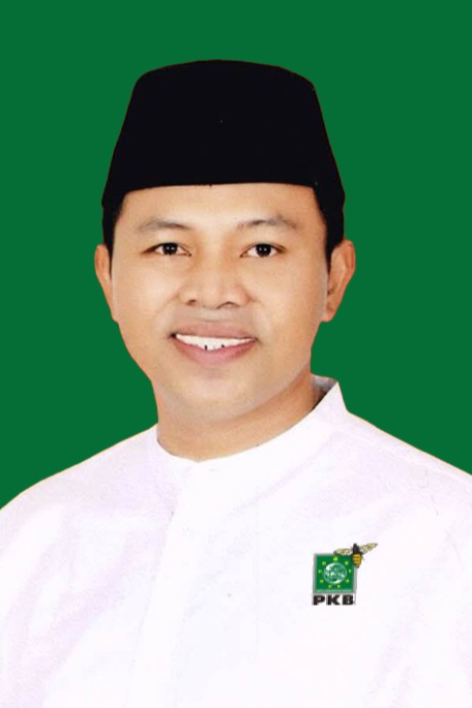

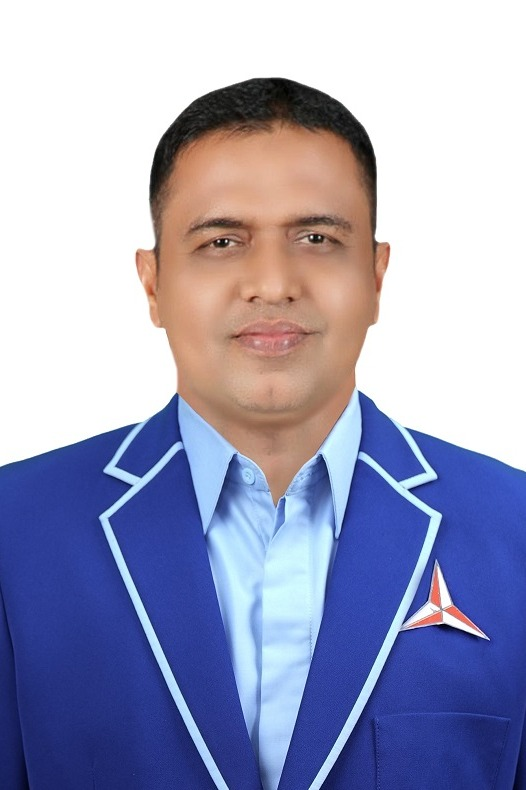

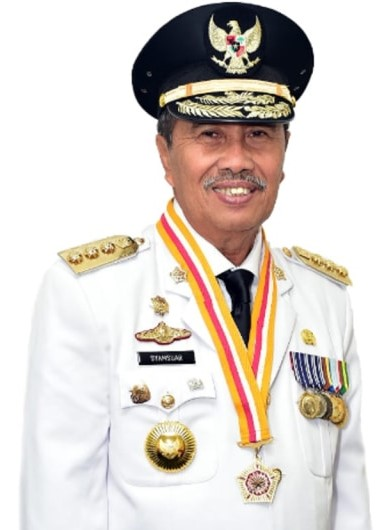
Candidate	Abdul Wahid	Muhammad Nasir	Syamsuar
Party	PKB	Demokrat	Golkar
Alliance	–	KIM Plus	–
Running mate	S. F. Hariyanto	Muhammad Wardan	Mawardi M. Saleh
Popular vote	1,224,193	877,511	661,297
Percentage	44.31%	31.76%	23.93%
- Results map by district
Governor before election
Rahman Hadi (acting)
Independent
Elected Governor
Abdul Wahid
PKB

The 2024 Riau gubernatorial election was held on 27 November 2024 as part of nationwide local elections to elect the governor of Riau for a five-year term. The previous election was held in 2018. The election was won by former House of Representatives member Abdul Wahid of the National Awakening Party (PKB), who received 44% of the vote. The Democratic Party's Muhammad Nasir placed second with 31%.

== Electoral system ==
The election, like other local elections in 2024, follow the first-past-the-post system where the candidate with the most votes wins the election, even if they do not win a majority. It is possible for a candidate to run uncontested, in which case the candidate is still required to win a majority of votes "against" an "empty box" option. Should the candidate fail to do so, the election will be repeated on a later date.

== Candidates ==
According to electoral regulations, in order to qualify for the election, candidates were required to secure support from a political party or a coalition of parties controlling 13 seats (20 percent of all seats) in the Riau Regional House of Representatives (DPRD). As no parties won 13 seats or more in the 2024 legislative election, parties are required to form coalitions in order to nominate a gubernatorial candidate. Candidates may alternatively demonstrate support to run as an independent in form of photocopies of identity cards, which in Riau's case corresponds to 402,235 copies. By the given deadline on midnight of 12 May 2024, no independent candidates had registered with the General Elections Commission (KPU).

=== Declared ===
The following are individuals who have been declared by a political party as endorsed candidates:

1
Candidate from PKB and PDIP
Abdul Wahid	S.F. Hariyanto
for Governor	for Vice Governor
nirbing	nirbing
Member of DPR RI PKB (2019–2024)	Acting Governor of Riau (2024)
Parties
17 / 65 (26%) PDIP (11 seats); PKB (6 seats)

2
Candidate from Demokrat and Gerindra
Muhammad Nasir	Muhammad Wardan
for Governor	for Vice Governor
nirbing	nirbing
Member of DPR RI Demokrat (2019–2024)	Regent of Indragiri Hilir (2018–2023)
Parties
22 / 65 (34%) Demokrat (8 seats); Gerindra (8 seats); PAN (5 seats); PPP (1 seat)

3
Candidate from Golkar and PKS
Syamsuar	Mawardi M. Saleh
for Governor	for Vice Governor
	nirbing
Governor of Riau (2018–2023)	Ulema Figure
Parties
20 / 65 (31%) Golkar (10 seats); PKS (10 seats)

=== Potential ===
The following are individuals who have either been publicly mentioned as a potential candidate by a political party in the DPRD, publicly declared their candidacy with press coverage, or considered as a potential candidate by media outlets:

- Edy Nasution (Nasdem, previous governor (2023–2024).
- Syamsuar (Golkar), former governor (2019–2023), elected member of the House of Representatives.
- Firdaus, former mayor of Pekanbaru (2012–2022).
- Muhammad Nasir (Demokrat), member of the House of Representatives.
- Abdul Wahid (PKB), chairman of PKB's Riau branch.
- Idris Laena (Golkar).
- Nazaruddin, vice regent of Pelalawan.
- M. Wardan, former regent of Indragiri Hilir.
- M. Haris, former regent of Pelalawan.

== Political map ==
Following the 2024 Indonesian legislative election, nine political parties are represented in the Riau DPRD:

Political parties	Seat count
Indonesian Democratic Party of Struggle (PDI-P)	11 / 65
Party of Functional Groups (Golkar)	10 / 65
Prosperous Justice Party (PKS)	10 / 65
Democratic Party (Demokrat)	8 / 65
Great Indonesia Movement Party (Gerindra)	8 / 65
NasDem Party	6 / 65
National Awakening Party (PKB)	6 / 65
National Mandate Party (PAN)	5 / 65
United Development Party (PPP)	1 / 65

== Results ==
Candidate	Running mate	Party	Votes	%
Abdul Wahid	S. F. Hariyanto	National Awakening Party	1,224,193	44.31
Muhammad Nasir	Muhammad Wardan	Democratic Party	877,511	31.76
Syamsuar	Mawardi M. Saleh	Golkar	661,297	23.93
Total			2,763,001	100.00
Valid votes			2,763,001	95.86
Invalid/blank votes			119,475	4.14
Total votes			2,882,476	100.00
Registered voters/turnout			4,827,022	59.72
Source: KPU

Candidate vote share by district
Abdul–Hariyanto

Nasir–Wardan

Syamsuar–Mawardi
