= Tuanku Tambusai Airport =

Tuanku Tambusai Airport Bandar Udara Tuanku Tambusai
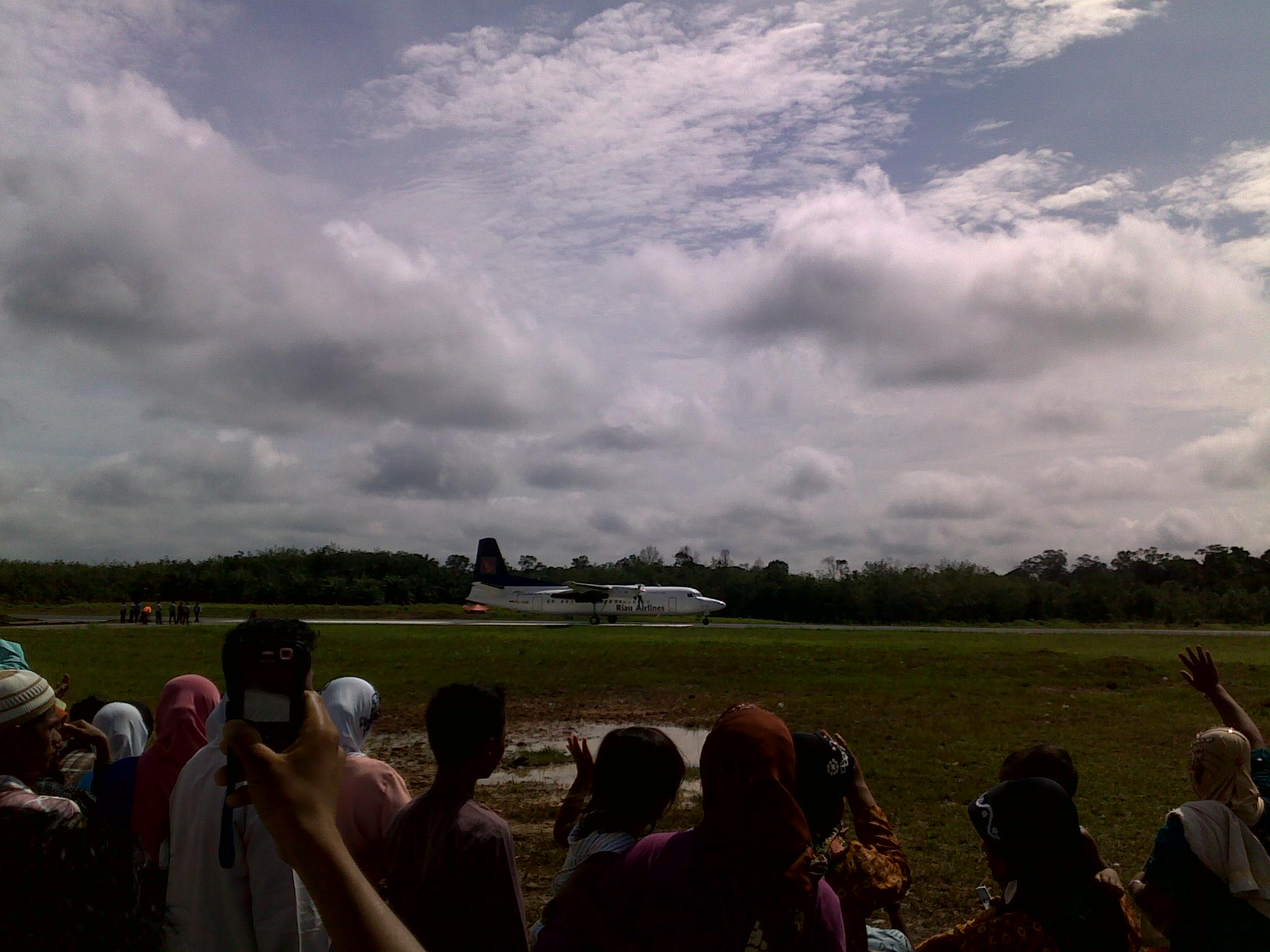
- Riau Airlines Fokker 50 at Tuanku Tambusai Airport
- IATA: PPR; ICAO: WIDE

Summary
- Airport type: Civil
- Operator: Government
- Serves: Pasir Pengaraian
- Location: Pasir Pengaraian, Riau, Indonesia
- Time zone: WIB (UTC+07:00)
- Coordinates: 00°50′43.72″N 100°22′11.40″E

Maps
- Sumatra region in Indonesia

- Location of the airport in Sumatra PPR (Indonesia)

Runways
Direction	Length		Surface
Direction	m	ft	Surface
n/n	1,300	4,265	Asphalt

Tuanku Tambusai Airport (IATA: PPR, ICAO: WIDE) is a domestic airport located in the Danausati village, district Rambah Samo, Rambah Samo County, Rokan Hulu, Riau, in Indonesia. It serves Pasir Pangaraian and surrounding areas. The airport can serve aircraft equivalent to BAe 146 and ATR 72.

== Facilities ==
- Telecommunication facilities (SSB, VHF)
- Non-directional beacon (NDB) Navigation
- Facilities landing aids (PAPI, R / W Light)
- Supporting aviation facilities and airport operations (generators, PLN)
- Supporting facilities cost (windshock)
- Space Arrival & Departure

== Airlines and destinations ==
Airlines	Destinations
Susi Air	Batam
Wings Air	Seasonal: Batam
