= Wan Abubakar =

Indonesian politician

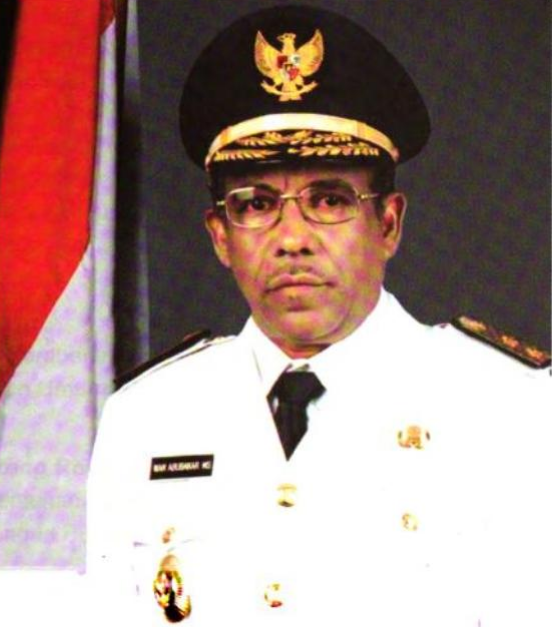

Governor of Riau
- In office 31 July 2008 – 21 November 2008
- Preceded by: Rusli Zainal
- Succeeded by: Rusli Zainal

Vice Governor of Riau
- In office 21 November 2003 – 31 July 2008
- Governor: Rusli Zainal
- Succeeded by: Raja Mambang Mit

Member of People's Representative Council
- In office 1 October 2009 – 1 October 2014
- Constituency: Riau I

Personal details
- Born: 9 August 1950 (age 74); Bengkalis, Indonesia
- Political party: United Development (until 2018); National Mandate (2018–present)

Wan Abubakar (born 9 August 1950) is an Indonesian politician who was a member of the People's Representative Council between 2009 and 2014. He also briefly served as governor of Riau in 2008. He served as the vice governor to Rusli Zainal since 2003, and when Zainal resigned in July 2008, Abubakar was elevated to governor for the rest of his term.

== Early life ==
Abubakar was born in what is today Bengkalis Regency on 9 August 1950. In 1975, he became a teacher at a Muhammadiyah-run school. Later in his career, he would receive a bachelor's degree in religious law from an institute in Pekanbaru (1995), and a masters in public administration from Satyagama University in Jakarta (2001).

== Political career ==
In 1977, Abubakar was elected into the Riau Regional House of Representatives. He would serve four terms until 1997, and then serve a fifth term between 1998 and 2003 as a member of the United Development Party (PPP).

Abubakar ran as the running mate to Rusli Zainal in the 2003 gubernatorial contest, with the support of PPP and the National Mandate Party, and the pair was elected in a surprise win against incumbent Saleh Djasit. At that point, Abubakar was serving as the deputy speaker of the provincial legislature. The pair's tenure commenced on 21 November 2003.

When the end of their first term was nearing, the pair did not run as a joint ticket, as Abubakar and Zainal had poor relations in office. In one occasion, Abubakar had criticized Zainal's decision to construct a monument commemorating his father-in-law, Ismail Suko, paid for from the provincial budget. Abubakar secured PPP's support for his candidacy as governor, but was unable to secure other parties' support. During this attempt, Abubakar had submitted a resignation letter to the Ministry of Home Affairs, but when it became clear that his gubernatorial run would fail, he opted to travel to Jakarta and retract his resignation. Zainal, meanwhile, did resign as governor to run for his reelection, and Abubakar was sworn in as full governor in his place on 31 July 2008. Zainal won his reelection bid, and replaced Abubakar on 21 November 2008.

After the end of his tenure, Abubakar ran as a candidate for the People's Representative Council (DPR) in the 2009 legislative election. He was elected as a representative of Riau's 1st district with 55,030 votes. He attempted to run in the 2013 gubernatorial election in Riau, but he failed to secure PPP's support. Despite this, he attempted to run as an independent candidate, but eventually failed to collect enough endorsements and his candidacy was disqualified by the General Elections Commission. In the 2014 legislative election, he did not run for a second DPR term, instead running as a candidate for the Regional Representative Council. He was not elected.

He ran for a second DPR term in the 2019 election as a candidate of the National Mandate Party which he had moved to in 2018. However, he was again not elected.

== Family ==
He is married to Wan Elizam Ali, and as of 2009 the couple had five children.
