= Ismail Suko =

Indonesian politician (1932–2011)

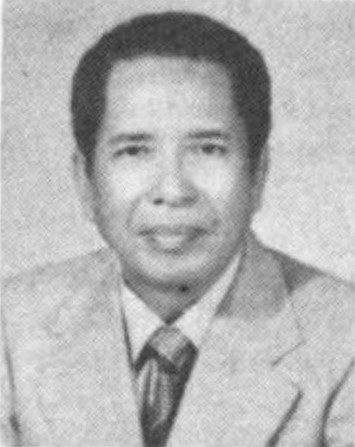
- Suko, c.1987

Member of People's Representative Council
- In office 1 October 1987 – 1 October 1992

Personal details
- Born: 15 June 1932 Rokan Hulu, Dutch East Indies
- Died: 16 May 2011 (aged 78) Malacca City, Malaysia

Ismail Suko (15 June 1932 – 16 May 2011) was an Indonesian politician and civil servant. He served as a member of the People's Representative Council from 1987 to 1992, after previously serving in the provincial legislature and civil service of Riau. He had been elected as governor by legislature vote in 1985, but was forced to resign in favor of the government-selected candidate Imam Munandar.

== Early life and education ==
Suko was born on 15 June 1932 in the hamlet of Muaranikum, part of Pasir Pengaraian in what is today Rokan Hulu Regency. He completed high school in 1955, and later obtained a diploma in economics and a degree in public administration.

== Career ==
Suko began his career in government in 1956, as an employee of the State Planning Bureau in Jakarta. In 1961, he moved to become an employee of the Prime Minister's office. He then became a high-ranking civil servant within the Ministry of the State Secretariat, and in 1968 he was appointed as regional secretary of Riau. Upon the expiry of this appointment in 1975, he was appointed secretary of the Riau Regional People's Representative Council.

=== 1985 election ===
In 1985, incumbent governor Imam Munandar was up for reelection. The central government in Jakarta had approved of his candidacy, despite the opposition of Riau's politicians who disliked his temperament. They sent a letter to President Suharto requesting Munandar not run for a second term, Suharto outright rejecting this request. These local politicians eventually agreed among themselves not to cast their vote for Munandar, and instead to vote for Suko. While in later public statements Suko claimed that he was unaware of this plan, the plotters claimed that Suko had been briefed on this, and that he was willing to take the risk.

On 2 September 1985, the day of the vote, Munandar was defeated by Suko who won 19 votes of 37. Receiving threats against his safety and fearing retaliation from the central government, Suko left Pekanbaru for Jakarta the following day, and was eventually pressured into resigning his candidacy by 10 September. Munandar was sworn in for his second term on 3 October 1985. After the events, the relieved Suko went on a hajj pilgrimage and he was later compensated by Golkar by being made a member of the People's Representative Council in 1987.

== Later life ==
He died on 16 June 2011 due to illness at Mahkota Hospital in Malacca City, Malaysia. After a brief public funeral service attended by thousands of Riau residents, Suko's body was buried the following day at a public cemetery in Pekanbaru.

== Family ==
Suko was married to Roslaini binti Jadin (d. 2021), and the couple had four children by 1992. Their eldest daughter, Septina Primawati, married future governor of Riau Rusli Zainal.
