= Abdul Wahid (governor) =

Indonesian politician

- عبد الوحيد
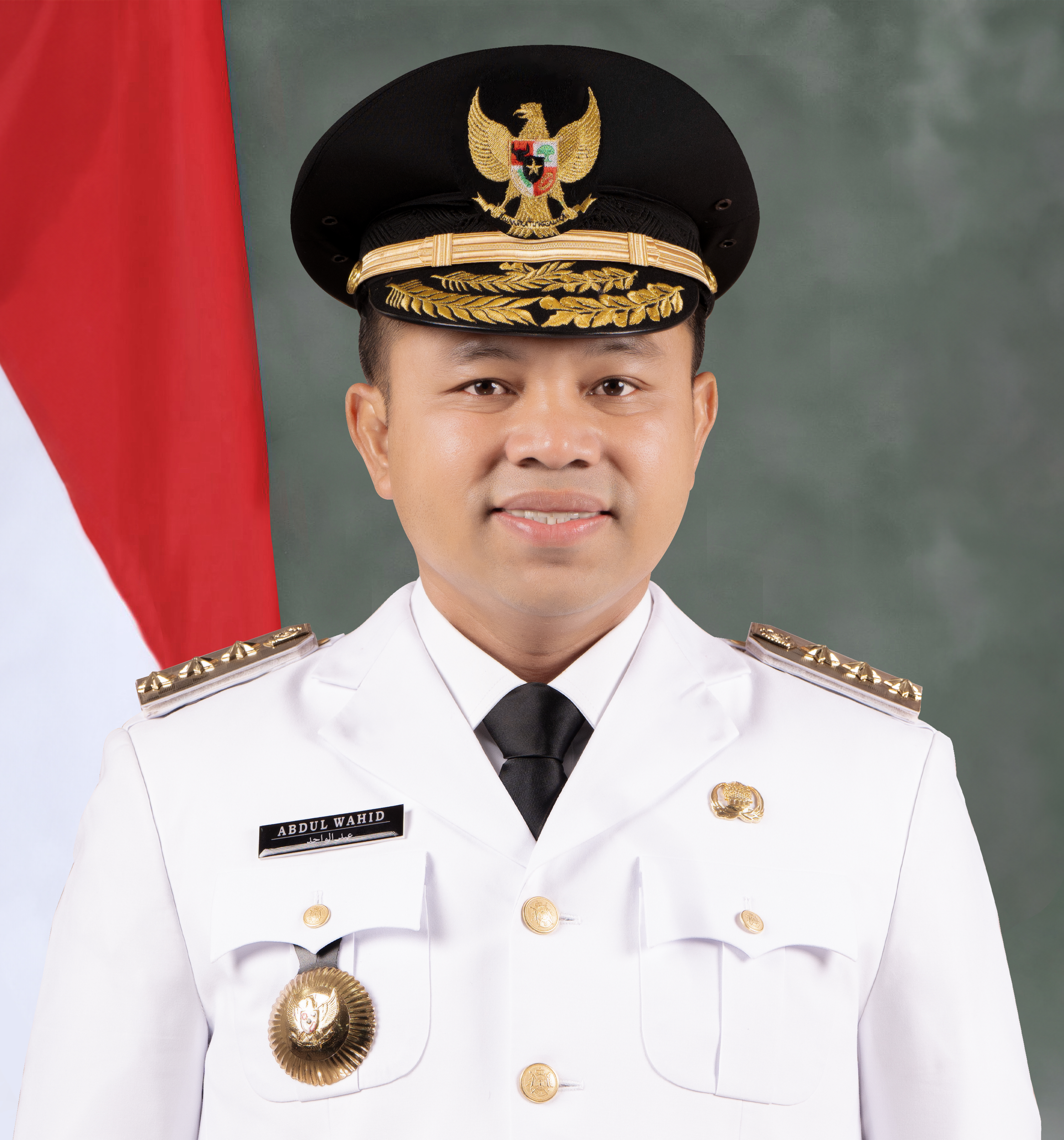
- Official portrait, 2025

15th Governor of Riau
- Incumbent
- Assumed office 20 February 2025
- Deputy: Sofyan Franyata Hariyanto
- Preceded by: S.F. Hariyanto (act.); Edy Nasution

Member of the House of Representatives
- In office 1 October 2019 – 23 September 2024
- Succeeded by: Mafirion
- Constituency: Riau II
- Majority: 55,770

Member of the Riau Regional House of Representatives
- In office 2009–2019

Personal details
- Born: 21 November 1980 (age 45) Indragiri Hilir, Riau, Indonesia
- Party: PKB

Abdul Wahid (Jawi: عبد الوحيد; born 21 November 1980) is an Indonesian politician of the National Awakening Party (PKB) who is the 15th governor of Riau, serving since February 2025. He was previously a legislator, representing Riau's 2nd electoral district in the House of Representatives between 2019 and 2024, and a member of the Riau Regional House of Representatives for two terms in 2009–2019.

== Early life ==
Abdul Wahid was born on 21 November 1980 in the hamlet of Anak Peria, in Indragiri Hilir Regency of Riau. After completing Islamic middle school in Indragiri Hilir, he studied at an Islamic boarding school in Agam. He then studied Islamic education at the Sultan Syarif Kasim II State Islamic University in Pekanbaru, graduating in 2004.

== Career ==
By 2002, while studying at Syarif Kasim, he had become a member of the Muslim Students' Association and joined the National Awakening Party (PKB). He was elected into the Riau Regional House of Representatives as a PKB member in the 2009 Indonesian legislative election, and became chair of PKB's fraction in the legislature. He was reelected in 2014.

In the 2019 election, Wahid ran for a seat in the national House of Representatives (DPR) in Riau's 2nd district. He won 55,770 votes and secured a seat, the majority of his voters coming from his home regency of Indragiri Hilir. He was reelected in the 2024 election from the same district, with 101,400 votes. He resigned from his DPR seat on 23 September 2024 to run as governor of Riau in the 2024 gubernatorial election, fellow PKB member Mafirion replacing him for the remainder of his term.

With former acting governor Sofyan Franyata Hariyanto as his running mate, Wahid won 1,224,193 votes (44.3%) in the three-way gubernatorial election, and was elected. On 3 November 2025, he was arrested by the Corruption Eradication Commission in a sting operation, under charges of extortion related to Riau's public works department.
