= Sukiman (regent) =

Indonesian politician

Lieutenant general (Ret.) Sukiman
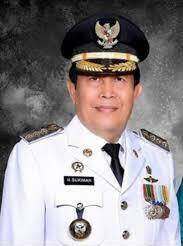
- Official portrait, 2021

7th Regent of Rokan Hulu
- Incumbent
- Assumed office 21 June 2021
- Preceded by: Abdul Haris (acting)
- In office 14 February 2018 – 22 April 2021
- Preceded by: Suparman
- Succeeded by: Abdul Haris (acting)

Personal details
- Born: 10 August 1953 (age 72) Madiun, East Java
- Party: Gerindra
- Spouse: Peni Herawati
- Children: 2

Military service
- Allegiance: Indonesia
- Branch/service: Indonesian Army
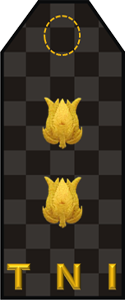
- Rank: Lieutenant general
- Unit: Anti-aircraft

Lieutenant general (Ret.) Sukiman (born 10 August 1953) is an Indonesian politician of the Gerindra political party, who is currently serving as the seventh regent of Rokan Hulu since 2018.
