= Edy Nasution =

Indonesian politician

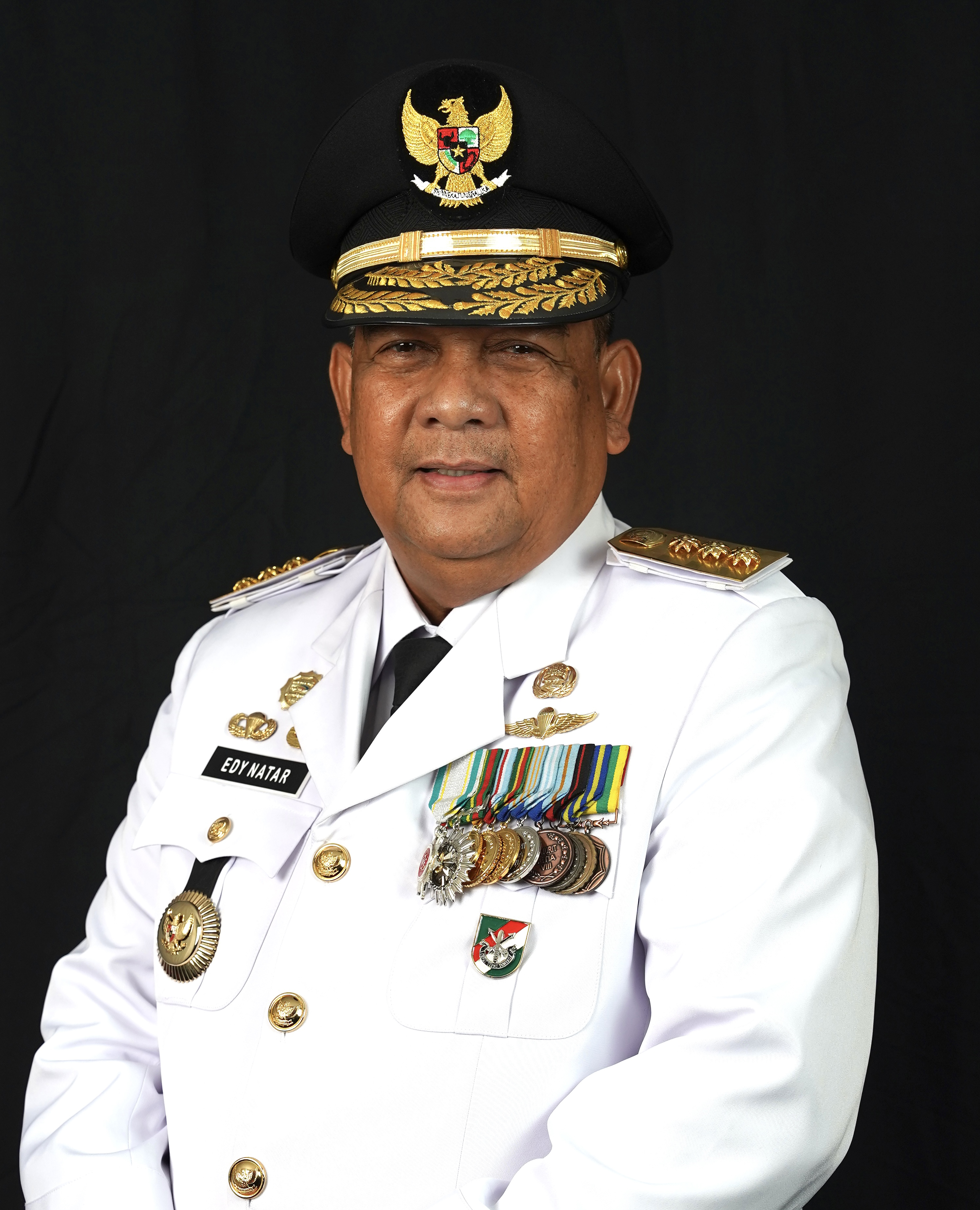

Governor of Riau
- In office 27 November 2023 – 20 February 2024; Acting: 4-27 November 2023
- Preceded by: Syamsuar
- Succeeded by: S.F. Hariyanto (act.)

Vice Governor of Riau
- In office 20 February 2019 – 3 November 2023
- Governor: Syamsuar
- Preceded by: Wan Thamrin Hasyim

Personal details
- Born: 29 May 1961 (age 65) Bengkalis, Riau, Indonesia
- Party: Nasdem

Military service
- Branch/service: Indonesian Army
- Years of service: 1984–2018
- Rank: Brigadier general

Edy Nasution (born 29 May 1961) is an Indonesian politician and former military officer. He briefly served as the governor of Riau between November 2023 and February 2024, replacing the previous governor Syamsuar who had resigned. He was previously Syamsuar's deputy between 2019 and 2023. He served in the Indonesian Army for over 30 years prior to entering politics, and reached the rank of brigadier general.

== Early life ==
Edy Nasution was born on 29 May 1961 in Bengkalis Regency, Riau, to Achmad Natar Nasution and Chairani Jadin. He enrolled at the Indonesian Military Academy, and graduated in 1984.

== Career ==
=== Military ===
After graduating from the military academy, Nasution was assigned as a platoon, later company commander for operations in East Timor. He was then reassigned to become a battalion commander at Kostrad, and was posted on the border with Papua New Guinea in 2000 to command border operations. Between 2007 and 2014, he was assigned abroad as a military attache. He was posted in Riau to command the local military district in 2017 as a brigadier general.

=== Politics ===
In January 2018, Nasution resigned from the armed forces in order to run in the 2018 Riau gubernatorial election. Becoming the running mate to Syamsuar, the pair defeated incumbent Arsyadjuliandi Rachman after winning 799,289 votes (38.2%). They were sworn in on 20 February 2019.

On 5 October 2023, Syamsuar resigned from his post as governor in order to run for a seat in the House of Representatives. Nasution became acting governor on 4 November 2023, and was sworn in as full governor on 27 November. His tenure as governor lasted until 20 February 2024, and S.F. Hariyanto was appointed in his place as acting governor.

He is a member of the NasDem Party, and has served as chairman of the party's Riau branch.

After his brief gubernatorial tenure, Nasution attempted to secure support to run a full term in the 2024 gubernatorial election. He failed to do so, and instead ran for mayor of Pekanbaru. He placed third in the five-way race with 56,159 votes.
