= Kabun =

Kabun may refer to:

- Kabun (Rokan Hulu), district in Rokan Hulu Regency, Indonesia
- Kabun (name), Japanese personal name
- Kabun, a wind god, no further information may be found under: Anishinaabe traditional beliefs
