= Wan Thamrin Hasyim =

Indonesian politician (born 1944)

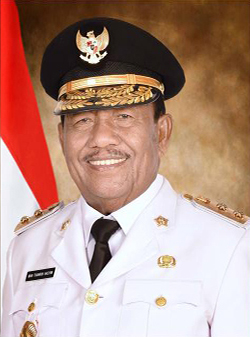

Governor of Riau
- In office 10 December 2018 – 19 February 2019; Acting between 24 September – 10 December 2018
- Preceded by: Arsyadjuliandi Rachman
- Succeeded by: Syamsuar

Vice Governor of Riau
- In office 12 May 2017 – 10 December 2018
- Preceded by: Arsyadjuliandi Rachman
- Succeeded by: Edy Nasution

Regent of Rokan Hilir
- In office 7 June 2001 – 7 June 2006
- Preceded by: Position created
- Succeeded by: Annas Maamun

Personal details
- Born: 27 December 1944 (age 80); Bagansiapiapi, Japan-occupied Dutch East Indies
- Political party: Golkar

Wan Thamrin Hasyim (born 27 December 1944) is an Indonesian politician who served as the governor of Riau between December 2018 and February 2019. Previously, he served as Vice Governor between 2017 and 2018, and was the first regent of Rokan Hilir Regency between 2001 and 2006.

== Early life ==
Hasyim was born in Bagansiapiapi, today in Rokan Hilir Regency, on 27 December 1944. He completed his basic education in North Sumatra.

== Career ==
In 1974, Hasyim became a civil servant for the Riau provincial government. He was promoted to head of the revenue office in the Riau Islands in 1983, which he served until 1997 when he was promoted to head of the economic bureau for the governor's office. In 1998, he became head of the mining bureau for the province, until June 2000 when he was appointed acting regent of Rokan Hilir Regency. He was later elected by the municipal council to serve as regent between 7 June 2001 and 2006. He did not take part in the 2006 election for the regency. After his tenure as regent, he was the chairman of the Raja Ali Haji Foundation, which operated the Lancang Kuning University in Riau.

Hasyim was elected by Riau's provincial legislature on 25 April 2017 as the vice gubernatorial replacement due to the vacancy created by the conviction of Annas Maamun for corruption and the elevation of his deputy Arsyadjuliandi Rachman in his place. He was sworn in on 12 May 2017. On 24 September 2018, with Rachman resigning as governor, Hasyim was appointed as acting governor of Riau, and was appointed as full governor on 10 December 2018. His term expired on 19 February 2019.
