= 2018 Riau gubernatorial election =

Local election in Indonesia

- 27 June 2018
- Turnout: 58.0%
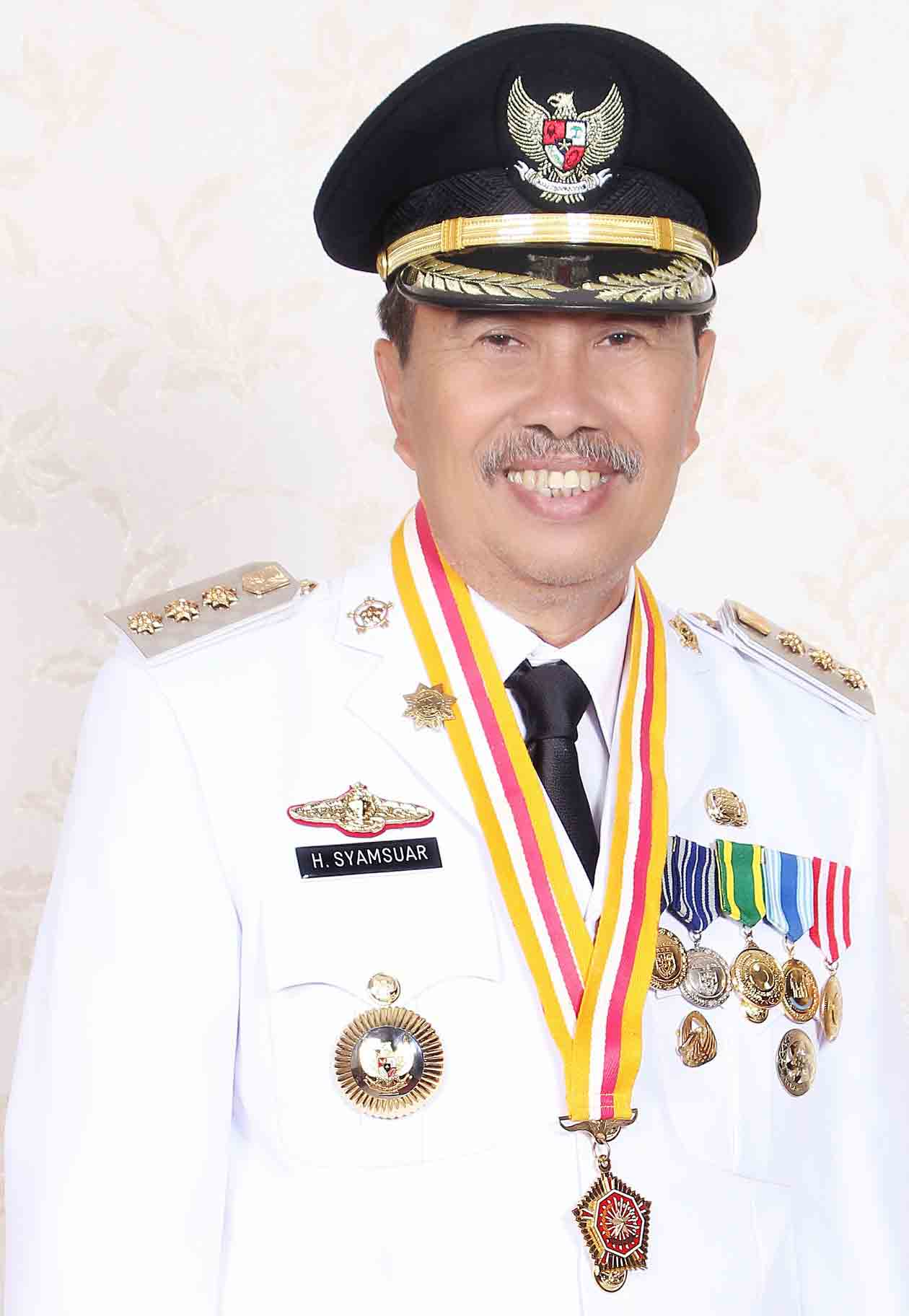

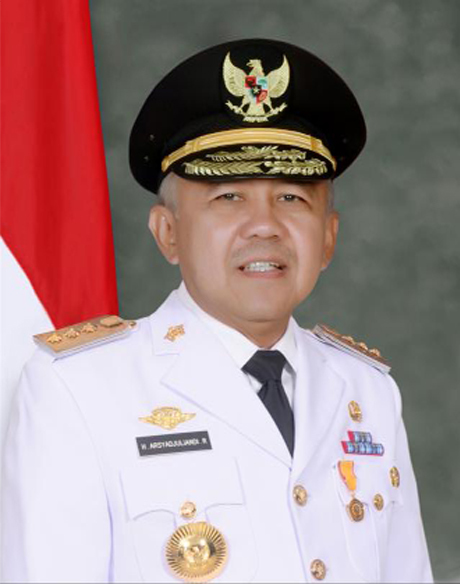

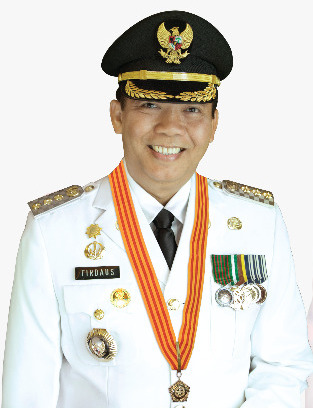

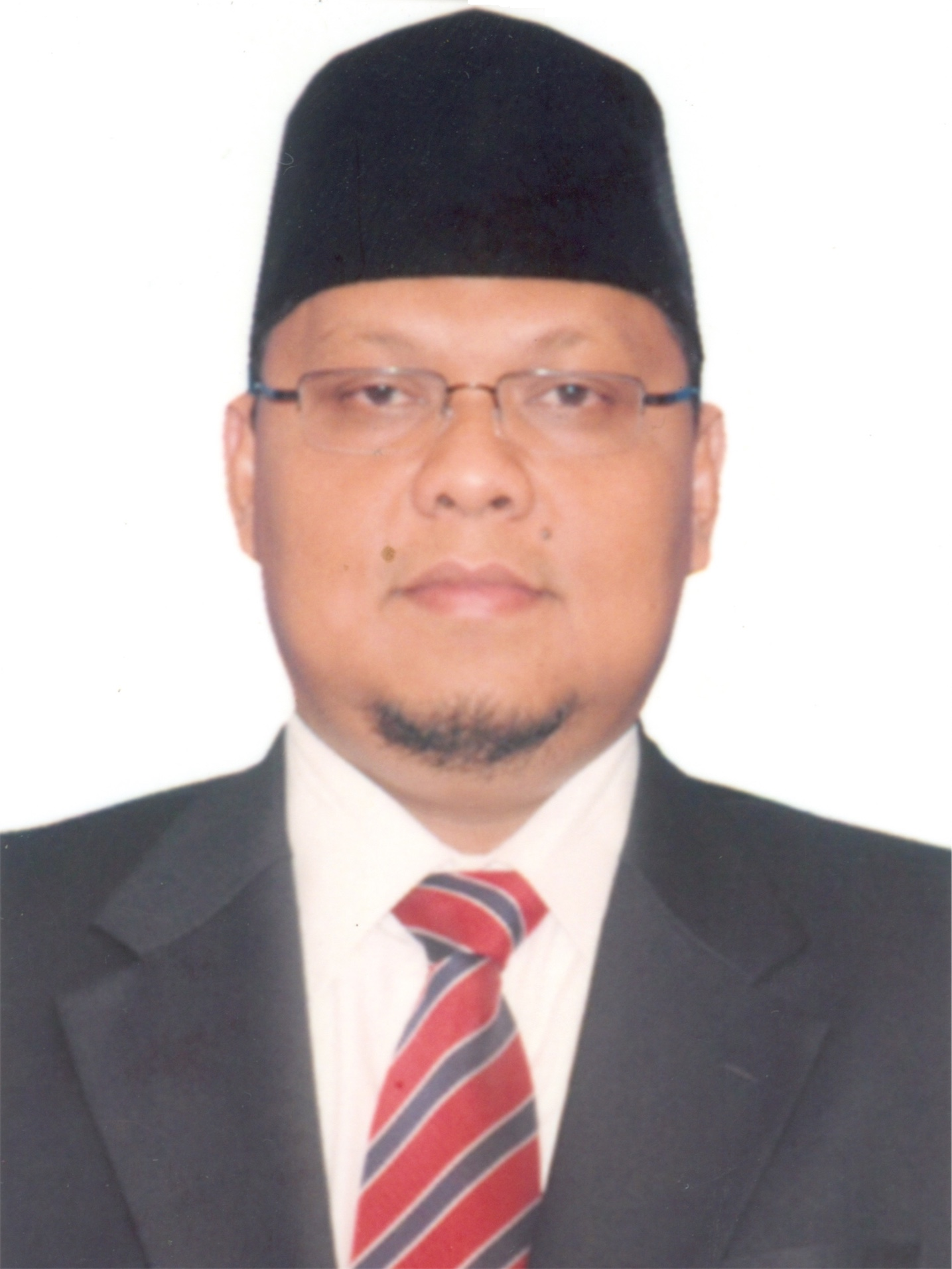
Nominee	Syamsuar	Arsyadjuliandi Rachman
Party	PAN	Golkar
Running mate	Edy Nasution	Suyatno
Popular vote	799,289	507,187
Percentage	38.20%	24.24%
Nominee	Firdaus	Muhammad Lukman Edy
Party	Demokrat	PKB
Running mate	Rusli Effendi	Hardianto
Popular vote	416,248	369,802
Percentage	19.89%	17.67%
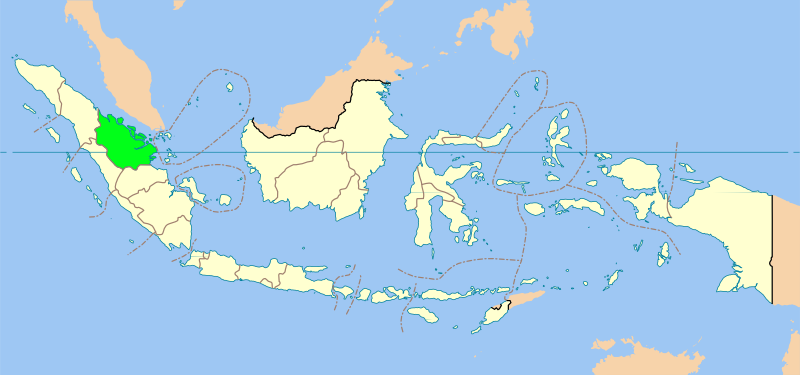
- Location of Riau within Indonesia
Governor before election
Arsyadjuliandi Rachman
Golkar
Elected Governor
Syamsuar
PAN

The 2018 Riau gubernatorial election took place on 27 June 2018 as part of the simultaneous local elections. It was held to elect the governor of Riau along with their deputy, whilst members of the provincial council (Dewan Perwakilan Rakyat Daerah) will be re-elected in 2019.

Four pairs of candidates contested the election, including incumbent governor Arsyadjuliandi Rachman. Other candidates are Firdaus, mayor of the province's capital Pekanbaru, DPR member and former cabinet minister Muhammad Lukman Edy, and Siak Regency regent Syamsuar.

After winning 38.2 percent of the votes, Syamsuar would defeat the incumbent and become governor for the 2018-2023 period.

== Timeline ==
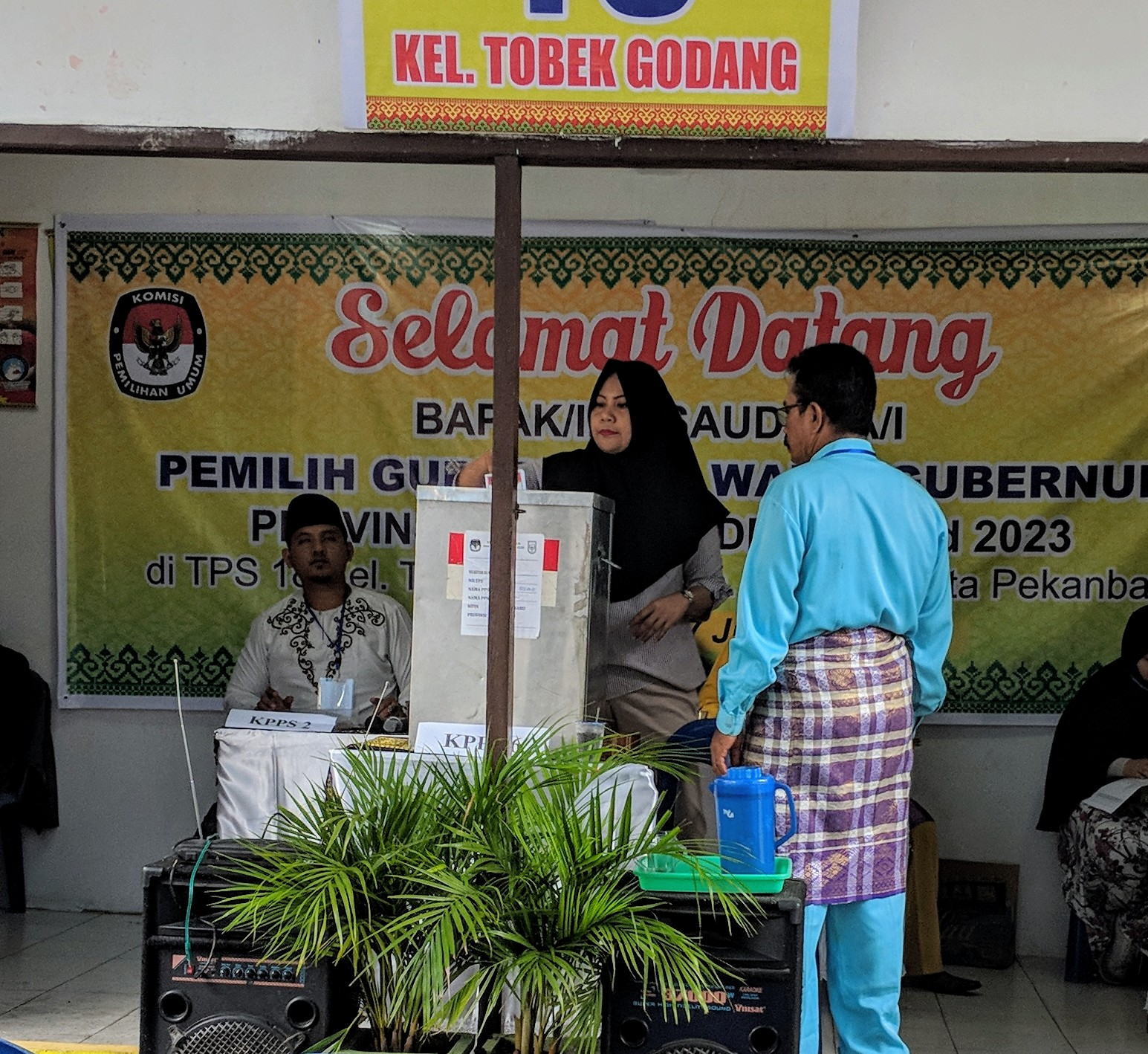
A voter submitting her ballot at a polling station in Pekanbaru, Riau

Registration for party-backed candidates were opened between 8 and 10 January 2018, while independent candidates were required to register between 22 and 26 November 2017. The candidates were assigned their ballot numbers on 13 February 2018. The campaigning period would commence between 15 February and 24 June, with a three-day election silence before voting on 27 June. In April 2018, KPU declared that there were 3,622,488 eligible voters for the election.

== Candidates ==
Under regulations, candidates are required to secure the support of a political party or a coalition thereof comprising at least 20 percent of the seats in the regional house. Alternatively, independent candidates may run provided they are capable of securing support from 8.5 percent of the total voter population (333,119 voters) in form of photocopied ID cards subject to verification by the local committee although no candidates expressing interest managed to do this.

#	Candidate	Position	Running mate	Parties
1	Syamsuar	Regent of Siak	Edy Nasution	PAN; PKS; Nasdem
2	Muhammad Lukman Edy	Member of People's Representative Council	Hardianto	PKB; Gerindra
3	Firdaus	Mayor of Pekanbaru	Rusli Effendi	Demokrat; PPP
4	Arsyadjuliandi Rachman	Incumbent governor	Suyatno	Golkar; PDI-P; Hanura

Syamsuar, having won elections in Siak Regency twice, was approved by PAN to run in the gubernatorial election despite himself being a member of Golkar. After securing the support of Nasdem and PKS, he was eligible to run with 13 seats in the provincial council. His running mate Edi Nasution is a brigadier general in the Indonesian Army, who was stationed at Pekanbaru.

Muhammad Lukman Edy had previously ran twice for governor - in 2008 and 2013 - and lost in both occasions. In addition to being member of DPR and holding a deputy chair post at MPR, he was the chairman of PKB's Riau office, and secured the support of his party to run. His running mate Hardianto is a member of Riau's provincial council, and the pair secured just enough seats in it to run (7 from PKB, 6 from Gerindra).

Also with 13 seats in the council, Pekanbaru mayor Firdaus ran for governorship. The supporting parties are his own (Demokrat, with 9 seats) and PPP (4 seats). His running mate, Rusli Effendi, is a PPP member who had served 10 years in the provincial council.

Incumbent Arsyadjuliandi Rachman (who was made governor following the arrest of his predecessor by the Corruption Eradication Commission in 2014) managed to secure the support of Golkar, PDI-P and Hanura. His running mate Suyatno was the regent of Rokan Hilir.

== Polling ==
Pollster	Date	Sample size	Syamsuar-Edy	Lukman-Hardianto	Firdaus-Rusli	Arsyad-Suyatno
Polmark	5–11 June 2018	1200	40.3	8.9	13.3	8.5
LKPI	24 May-6 June 2018	1985	25.6	33.2	12.3	11.2
Poltracking	20–25 February 2018	800	19.8	17.8	16.4	11.2

== Results ==
=== Quick count ===
Pollster	Syamsuar-Edy	Lukman-Hardianto	Firdaus-Rusli	Arsyad-Suyatno
Polmark	38.17	17.25	20.23	24.35
