= Rusli Zainal =

Indonesian politician (b. 1957)

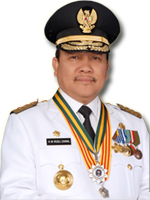
- Zainal as Governor of Riau

Governor of Riau
- In office 21 November 2008 – 12 November 2013
- Preceded by: Wan Abubakar
- Succeeded by: Annas Maamun
- In office 21 November 2003 – 31 July 2008
- Preceded by: Saleh Djasit
- Succeeded by: Wan Abubakar

Regent of Indragiri Hilir
- In office 1999–2003
- Preceded by: Azwin Yacob
- Succeeded by: Indra Muchlis Adnan

Personal details
- Born: 3 December 1957 (age 68) Indragiri Hilir, Riau, Dutch East Indies
- Party: Golkar

Rusli Zainal (born 3 December 1957) is an Indonesian former politician convicted of corruption who served two terms as Governor of Riau between 2003 and 2013. He was also previously regent of Indragiri Hilir Regency. He was sentenced to 14 years in prison in 2014, later reduced to 10 years, and was released on parole in 2022.

== Early life and education ==
Zainal was born in a village within Mandau district, today in Indragiri Hilir Regency, on 3 December 1957. As a child, Zainal took part in the Indonesia International Quran Competition at the national level, representing Riau. He later enrolled at the University of Riau, obtaining a bachelor's degree in economics.

== Career ==
After graduating, Zainal began a construction business. He was elected into Riau's provincial legislature, and in 1999 he was elected as regent of Indragiri Hilir.

Zainal ran as a candidate for Riau's governor in the 2003 election, unexpectedly securing a victory against incumbent Saleh Djasit with 34 out of 54 votes from the provincial legislature. On 21 November 2003, he was sworn in as the governor of Riau. He was reelected as governor in the 2008 gubernatorial election with 57.5 percent of votes. On 8 February 2013, he was named a suspect by the Corruption Eradication Commission for bribery related to the 2012 National Sports Week event, and he was officially detained after questioning on 14 June 2013. In response to the investigation, his party Golkar revoked his membership in June 2013.

His tenure as governor was terminated due to the case on 12 November 2013, eight days before its supposed date, and the Pekanbaru District Court sentenced him to 14 years in prison on 12 March 2014. Following an appeal to the Supreme Court, Zainal's sentence was reduced to 10 years. He was released on parole on 21 July 2022.

== Family ==
Zainal has two wives; Septiana Primawati and Syarifah Darmiati. Primawati is the eldest daughter of Ismail Suko, once governor-elect of Riau.

== Honours ==
=== National ===
- Satyalancana Pendidikan - 2007
- Lencana Melati Pramuka
- Lencana Darma Bakti Pramuka

=== Foreign ===
- Malaysia
  - Malacca
    - Grand Commander of the Exalted Order of Malacca (DGSM) – Datuk Seri (2011)
