= Firdaus (Indonesian politician) =

Indonesian politician

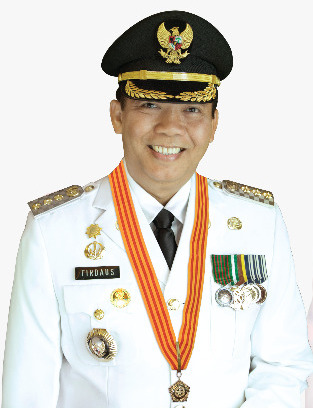

14th Mayor of Pekanbaru
- In office 26 January 2012 – 22 May 2022
- President: Susilo Bambang Yudhoyono; Joko Widodo
- Governor: Rusli Zainal; Annas Maamun; Arsyadjuliandi Rachman
- Deputy: Ayat Cahyadi
- Preceded by: Herman Abdullah
- Succeeded by: Muflihun (acting)

Personal details
- Born: 2 May 1960 (age 66) Kampar, Riau, Indonesia
- Education: Riau Islamic University; Institute of Domestic Governance

Firdaus (mononymic; born May 2, 1960) is the former mayor of Pekanbaru in 2012 and 2022. He had been elected as mayor twice and 2017 where he won 92,384 votes (32.99%).

== Political career ==
On May 18, 2011, Firdaus together with Ayat Cahyadi ran as candidates for mayor and deputy mayor of Pekanbaru in the regional elections, competing with the pair Septina Primawati Rusli who is the wife of the Governor of Riau Rusli Zainal and Erizal Muluk. On January 13, 2012 the Constitutional Court declared Firdaus and Ayat Cahyadi as the winners of the election for Mayor and Deputy Mayor of Pekanbaru.

== Honours ==
- Satyalancana Karya Bhakti Praja Nugraha - 2019
- Satyalancana Pembangunan - 2019
- Satyalancana Wira Karya - 2013
- Lencana Melati Gerakan Pramuka
- Lencana Darma Bakti Gerakan Pramuka
