= Soeripto =

Indonesian military officer (1934–2010)

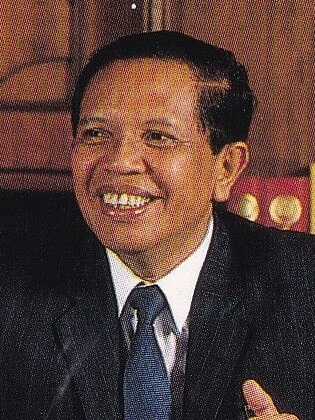
- Soeripto as Governor of Riau

Governor of Riau
- In office 10 December 1988 – 21 November 1998
- Preceded by: Imam Munandar
- Succeeded by: Saleh Djasit

14th Commander of Kostrad
- In office 30 January 1986 – 21 August 1987
- Preceded by: Soeweno
- Succeeded by: Adolf Sahala Rajagukguk

Personal details
- Born: 18 November 1934 Temanggung, Dutch East Indies
- Died: 7 January 2010 (aged 75) Jakarta, Indonesia
- Resting place: Kalibata Heroes' Cemetery

Military service
- Allegiance: Indonesia
- Branch/service: Indonesian Army
- Years of service: 1960–1989
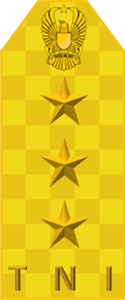
- Rank: Lieutenant general (honorary)
- Unit: Infantry
- Commands: Kostrad; Kodam I/Bukit Barisan

Soeripto (EYD: Suripto; 18 November 1934 – 7 January 2010) was an Indonesian military officer. He was commander of the Indonesian Army Strategic Reserve Command (Kostrad) and of Kodam I/Bukit Barisan, in addition to serving as the governor of Riau between 1988 and 1998.

== Early life ==
Soeripto was born in what is today Temanggung Regency on 18 November 1934. He completed high school in 1956, and enrolled at the Indonesian Military Academy in Magelang from which he graduated in 1960.

== Career ==
=== Military ===
After graduating from the academy, Soeripto first commanded a platoon within Kodam Diponegoro. In 1965, he moved to Kodam Jaya, gradually rising through the ranks until he was commander of North Jakarta's military district by 1973, and that year he enrolled at the Army Command and Staff College as a lieutenant colonel. He then moved to military intelligence and public relations, serving as intelligence assistant to the commanders of Kodam Cenderawasih, Kodam Siliwangi, and Sumatra's Defence Command, in addition to becoming deputy chief of the army information service in 1977.

In 1982, Soeripto was appointed as chief of staff of the Army Strategic Reserve Command (Kostrad). He was further appointed to command Kodam Bukit Barisan in 1983, which covered North Sumatra, West Sumatra, and Riau. He was then appointed as Commander of Kostrad on 30 January 1986 as a major general, serving until 21 January 1987. He retired from the military on 12 November 1989. After his retirement, he was given an honorary promotion to the rank of lieutenant general on 1 September 1997.

=== As governor ===
Soeripto was appointed as an armed forces representative in the People's Representative Council in 1987. On 30 November 1988, Soeripto was voted in as the governor of Riau by the province's legislature, winning with 35 out of 45 votes. He was officially made governor on 10 December.

During his 10-year tenure as governor, Soeripto was noted as being supportive of the development of media outlets in the province. When he took office, there were no daily newspapers in the province, and Soeripto took steps to aid journalistic education, including taking part in the founding of Riau's first daily newspaper Riau Pos. He ended his term on 21 November 1998 and was replaced by Saleh Djasit.

== Death ==
Soeripto died on 7 January 2010, at the age of 75, after abruptly collapsing in his bathroom. He was rushed to the hospital, but was pronounced dead before he got there. He was buried the following day at Kalibata Heroes' Cemetery.
