= Subrantas Siswanto =

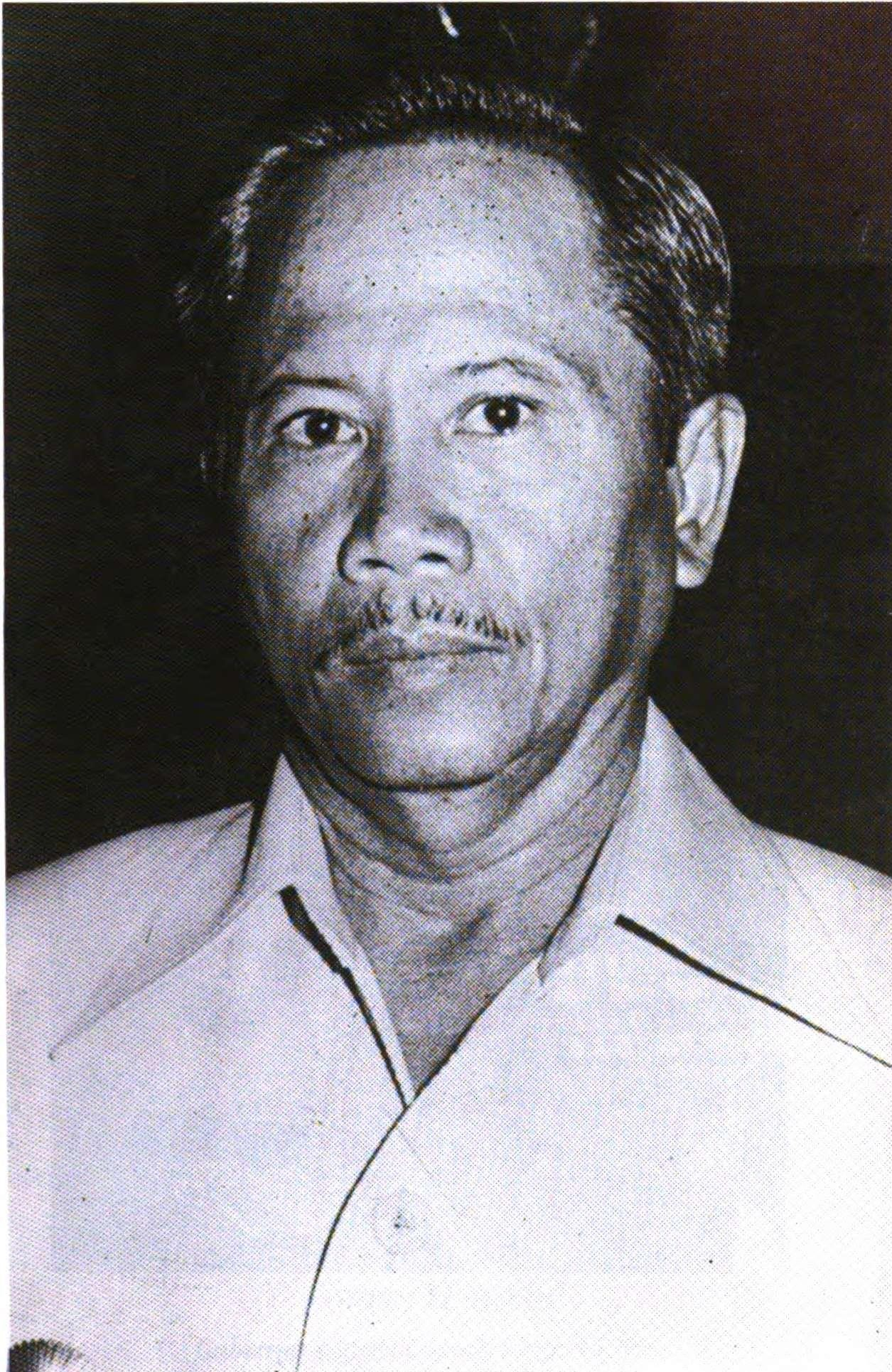
- Siswanto as Governor of Riau

Governor of Riau
- In office 14 June 1978 – 14 May 1980
- Preceded by: Arifin Achmad
- Succeeded by: Imam Munandar

Regent of Kampar
- In office 18 May 1967 – 14 June 1978
- Preceded by: Tengku Muhammad
- Succeeded by: Abdul Makah Hamid

Personal details
- Born: 11 April 1923 Purworejo, Dutch East Indies
- Died: 14 May 1980 (aged 57) Pekanbaru, Riau, Indonesia

Military service
- Allegiance: Indonesia
- Branch/service: Indonesian Army
- Rank: Brigadier general

Subrantas Siswanto (11 April 1923 – 14 May 1980) was an Indonesian military officer who served as the governor of Riau between 1978 and 1980, and previously as the regent of Kampar Regency between 1967 and 1978.

== Biography ==
Siswanto was born in Purworejo, today in Central Java, on 11 April 1923. He was transported to Sumatra during the Japanese occupation of the Dutch East Indies along with romusha corvee laborers, but once he was in Pekanbaru, he instead joined the Japanese Navy. During the Indonesian National Revolution, he fought the Dutch in Sumatra, and spent some time in Bengkalis. After the revolution, he was appointed chief of staff of several military units stationed in Riau. Starting from 18 May 1967, he was appointed as the regent of Kampar, serving until 1978.

After his time in Kampar, Siswanto was appointed as Riau's governor, and he was sworn in on 14 June 1978. In the middle of his term, on 14 May 1980, he died of liver cancer in Pekanbaru. At the time of his death he held the rank of brigadier general.
