= Imam Munandar =

Indonesian military officer (1927–1988)

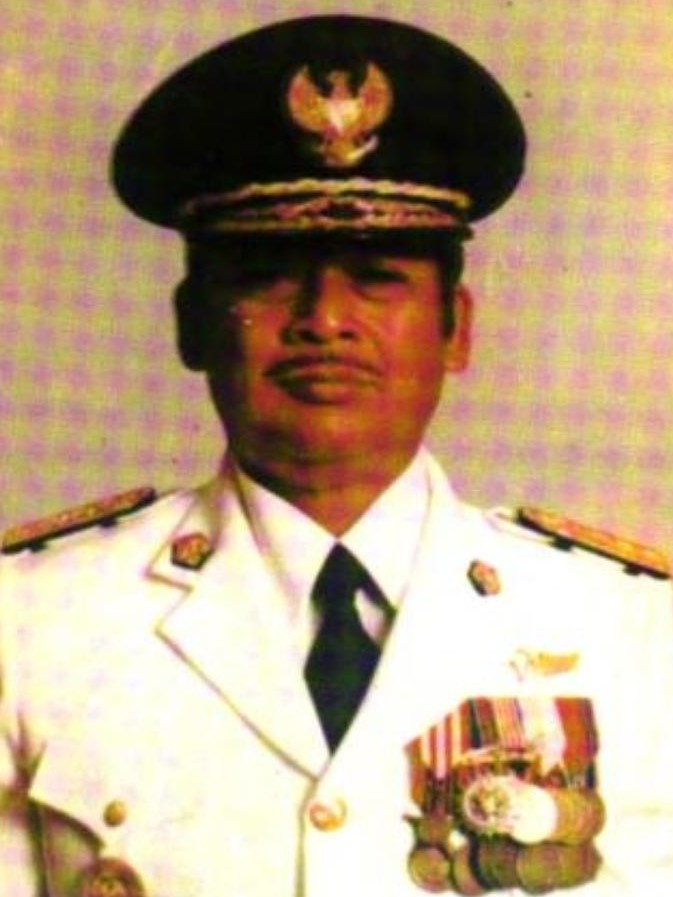
- Munandar as Governor of Riau

Governor of Riau
- In office 2 October 1980 – 21 June 1988
- Preceded by: Subrantas Siswanto
- Succeeded by: Soeripto

Personal details
- Born: 15 June 1927 Blitar, Dutch East Indies
- Died: 21 June 1988 (aged 61) Surabaya, East Java, Indonesia

Military service
- Allegiance: Indonesia
- Branch/service: Indonesian Army
- Rank: Major general

Imam Munandar (15 June 1927 – 21 June 1988) was an Indonesian military officer who also served as the governor of Riau between 1980 and his death in 1988. He was primarily active within the Kodam V/Brawijaya, and was appointed as governor in 1980 following his predecessor's death. He secured his second term in 1985 despite local opposition, after his opponent was forced to resign his candidacy.

== Early life ==
Munandar was born in Blitar on 15 June 1927, and graduated from a colonial elementary school (Hollandsch-Inlandsche School) in 1940. He completed middle school in 1943, although he obtained his high school diploma from a technical school in 1951.

== Career ==
=== Military ===
During the Japanese occupation of the Dutch East Indies, Munandar joined the Defenders of the Homeland (PETA) paramilitary organization. He held the rank of platoon commander, having been trained by and being a direct subordinate of future president Suharto. He joined the nascent Indonesian Army, and served during the Indonesian National Revolution as part of the Brawijaya Division, during which he took part in the crackdowns following the Madiun Affair of 1948. In independent Indonesia, he took part in operations against the South Maluku Republic, the Darul Islam revolt, and the PRRI/Permesta rebellion.

In the aftermath of the 30 September movement in 1965, Munandar took part in the anti-communist crackdowns, as the commander of Surabaya's military district. On one occasion, he remarked to his commanding officer that their unit should release imprisoned Indonesian Communist Party cadres so that they could be killed.

He continued to serve within Brawijaya until 1975, when he was assigned to become commander of the Papuan military area command, holding the post until 1980. During his time as commander, the Indonesian Army launched a major operation against the Free Papua Movement in 1976. At the time, as a major general, he was considered to become a potential governor for Irian Jaya, but due to popular rejection the idea was shelved. Afterwards, he was stationed at Tanjungpinang as part of an anti-smuggling operation.

=== As governor ===
In 1980, the sitting governor of Riau, Subrantas Siswanto, died in office and Munandar was selected to replace him. He was sworn in as Governor on 2 October 1980. Munandar was a notoriously harsh talker, and had a tendency to scold his subordinates in public. In his first two years in office, he had amicable relations with local Malay politicians in Riau. He promoted the development of palm oil and coconut plantations, particularly in the province's coastal regions, in addition to continuing the development of the Batam project. Later in his first term, however, Munandar's relationship with local politicians deteriorated as he became more temperamental.

When Munandar was up for reelection in 1985, the central government in Jakarta had approved of his candidacy, despite the opposition of Riau's politicians. They sent a letter to President Suharto requesting Munandar not run for a second term, Suharto outright rejecting this request. These local politicians eventually agreed among themselves to not cast their vote for Munandar, and instead to vote for the provincial legislature's secretary and senior civil servant Ismail Suko. On 2 September 1985, the day of the vote, Munandar was defeated by Suko who won 19 votes of 37. Fearing retaliation from the central government, Suko left Pekanbaru for Jakarta the following day, and was eventually pressured into resigning his candidacy by 10 September. Munandar was sworn in for his second term on 3 October 1985. He also was appointed as a member of the People's Representative Council in 1987, as a representative of Riau. He did not complete his second term, however, as he died due to liver cancer at Surabaya's Dr. Soetomo Hospital on 21 June 1988.

== Personal life ==
Munandar was married to Sri Mujinab (d. 1983).
