= Syamsuar =

Indonesian politician (born 1954)

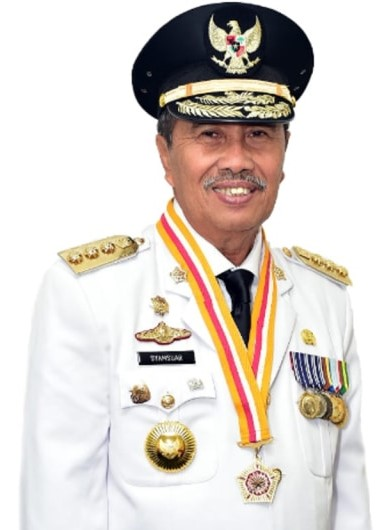

Governor of Riau
- In office 20 February 2019 – 3 November 2023
- Preceded by: Wan Thamrin Hasyim
- Succeeded by: Edy Nasution

Regent of Siak
- In office 20 June 2011 – 4 February 2019
- Preceded by: Arwin AS
- Succeeded by: Alfedri

Personal details
- Born: 8 June 1954 (age 72) Rokan Hilir, Riau, Indonesia
- Party: Golkar
- Education: University of North Sumatra; Riau University

Syamsuar (born 8 June 1954) is an Indonesian politician who served as the Governor of Riau from 2019 until 2023. He previously served as Regent of Siak Regency between 2011 and 2019.

== Early life ==
Syamsuar was born on 8 June 1954 in the village of Jumrah, today in Rimba Melintang district of Rokan Hilir Regency, Riau, as the second son of Wahi Abdullah and Rahimah. His father farmed rice and rubber. He entered elementary school in his home village, before moving to Bagansiapiapi for middle school and Bengkalis for his high school, graduating in 1972.

== Career ==
After graduating from high school, he moved to Sawahlunto to work there at a coal mine. After three years, he moved to Bengkalis and became a contract worker for the local government. While in Bengkalis, he went to a government academy, being accepted as a civil servant in 1987 and later obtaining a bachelor's degree in 1990 from the University of North Sumatra. He rose up the ranks between 1987 and 1996, and he had been appointed district head of Siak by 1996 and then of West Tanjung Pinang in 2000. By 2001, he had become the deputy regent of Siak Regency. In 2006, he ran in the regency election as the regent candidate, but was defeated by incumbent Arwin AS. During this period, he obtained his master's degree from Riau University in 2005.

After the election loss, Syamsuar worked in the provincial government of Riau, becoming the secretary of the provincial election commission in 2008, provincial inspector in 2010, and then acting regent of Meranti Islands Regency. He took part in Siak regency's election again in 2011, this time winning with 38 percent of the votes (in a four-candidate race). He would be reelected in 2016 with 59.6% of votes.

=== Siak regent ===
In 2017, Syamsuar mandated the wearing on Thursdays of Tanjak, a traditional Malay headwear, for civil servants in order to popularize its use. He also worked with the Malaysian consulate in Pekanbaru for relationships in cultural and sports fields. The old city of Siak, the former capital of the Sultanate of Siak Sri Indrapura, was also designated a Cultural Property of Indonesia during his tenure. Siak was signed up to be a "green" regency, aimed at conservation of remaining peatland in the regency.

He formally resigned as regent on 4 February 2019, in order to take up his new office as governor.

=== Riau governor ===
Syamsuar took part in the 2018 Riau gubernatorial election with Edy Nasution as his running mate, winning the election with 38.2 percent of votes. He was sworn in on 20 February 2019.

On 3 November 2023, Syamsuar officially resigned from his governorship in order to run for a seat in the House of Representatives in the 2024 legislative election. He won a seat from the Riau 1st electoral district.

== Honours ==
- Bintang Legiun Veteran Indonesia
- Satyalancana Karya Satya
- Lencana Melati Gerakan Pramuka
- Lencana Darma Bakti Gerakan Pramuka
