= Intsiawati Ayus =

Indonesian politician

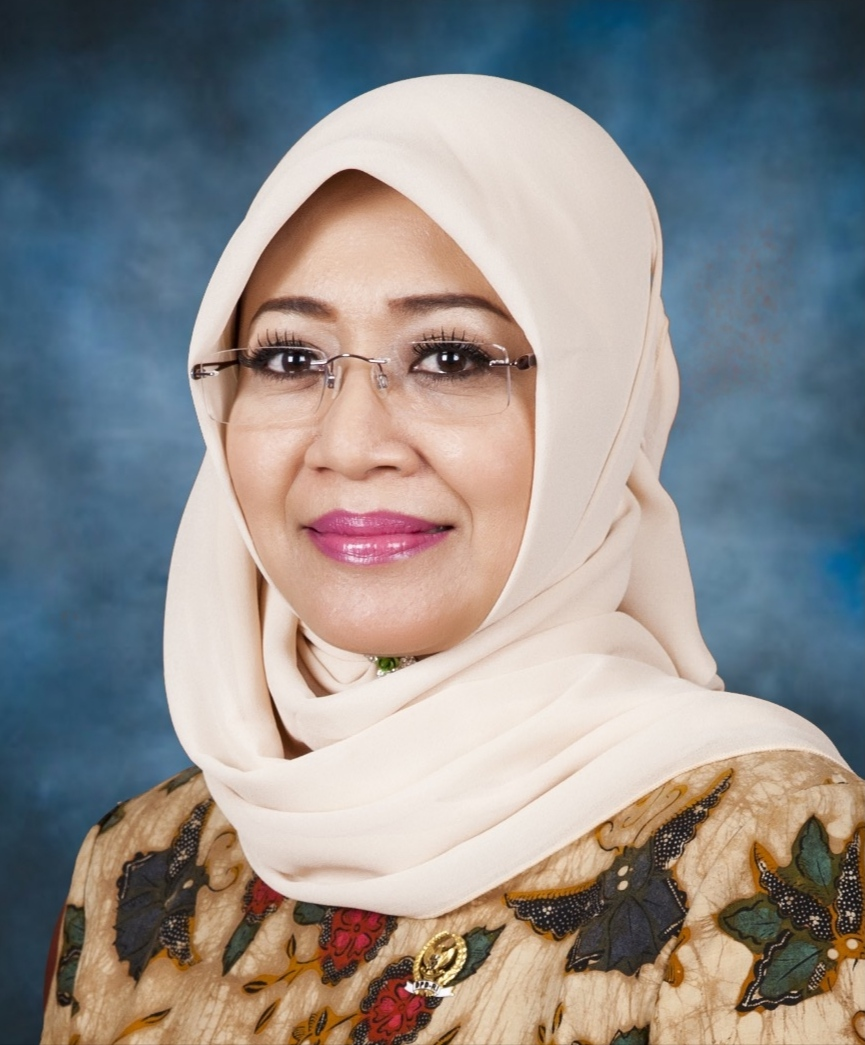
- Official portrait

Senator for Riau
- Incumbent
- Assumed office 1 October 2004

Personal details
- Born: 4 May 1968 (age 58) Bengkalis, Riau, Indonesia
- Party: United Development Party (2001–2022); NasDem Party (2023); Perindo Party (2023); National Mandate Party (since 2023)
- Spouse: Erwin S.
- Parent: Asman Yunus (father)
- Education: Riau Islamic University (LLB); Islamic University of Indonesia (LLM); Bandung Islamic University
- Occupation: Politician
- Website: www.intsiawati.com

Intsiawati Ayus (born 4 May 1968) is an Indonesian politician who became a member of the House of Representatives (DPR) for the Riau Province since 2004.

== Education ==
At SD Negeri Pematang Peranap, Indragiri Hulu in 1981, she completed her elementary schooling. After that, she attended SMA Negeri 1 Pekanbaru in 1987 and SMP Negeri 5 Pekanbaru in 1984 to finish her secondary school. In 1992, she graduated with a Bachelor of Laws (LLB) from the Riau Islamic University (UIR). In 2004, she graduated with a Master of Laws (LLM) degree from the Islamic University of Indonesia (UII) in Yogyakarta. At the Bandung Islamic University (UNISBA), she obtained a doctorate in law in 2020.

== Career ==
=== United Development Party ===
After being supported by the United Development Party (PPP) in 2001, Intsiawati launched her first political career by standing for mayor in the Pekanbaru DPRD mayoral election. Sadly, she was not elected. Then, in 2004, as a candidate from the province of Riau, ran for DPD RI Member. She received 125,890 votes, placing her third. With 144,559 votes, she managed to come in second in the subsequent DPD RI Election (2009).

Moved to improve the state of her hometown in the Meranti Islands, where her father served as a forestry supervisor, Intsiawati in 2010 tried the Meranti Islands Regent Election competition paired with one of the DPRD Members named Amyurlis but she was not successful.

Once Intsiawati returned to parliament, the diligence and effectiveness she demonstrated in her second term appeared to further boost the confidence of the Riau people. The number of votes increased 2.5 times in the subsequent 2014 DPD RI Election serves as evidence of this. With 352,603 votes and a top ranking, Intsiawati garnered an impressive amount of support in this third DPD RI election.

On 22 August 2017, Intsiawati was chosen to serve as the Group Leader or Chairman of the BPKK (Institutional Capacity Development Agency) at MPR RI, Jakarta. Eight competitors—two from the west, three from the east, and three from the center—were defeated by her.

=== Nasdem-Perindo stint ===
Intsiawati announced in a news release on 4 January 2023, that she was steadily making her way through the NasDem Party. Additionally, she stated that one should always run in the general election because the number of votes cast consistently rises. She claimed that her decision to join was both objective and subjective. Surya Paloh took a while to decide whether or not to invite her to the party. After presenting themselves as a Nasdem candidate for the DPR RI in Riau, the Intsiawati ultimately joined the Perindo Party. On 28 February 2023, she told reporters that although she was still awaiting the Constitutional Court's ruling, she thought the 2024 election system would return to closed proportions.

Intsiawati Ayus has re-joined a political organisation. Resigning from the Perindo Party candidacy was her decision. She acknowledged having written an official resignation letter to the Perindo Party DPP in Jakarta, which CAKAPLAH validated. "I sent the DPP a letter of resignation on 21 July 2023. On the 22nd, she stated, "My experts personally delivered the letter, which was accepted by Donny Ferdiansyah, the Wasekjend DPP Perindo." She acknowledged that there was a disagreement between her and Perindo that led to her departure from both legislative candidate and the cadre.

Ahmad Rofiq, Secretary General of the Perindo Party DPP, stated that the party would support legislative candidate Intsiawati to the fullest extent possible, as she was deemed the best candidate for Riau on 24 July 2023. She was regarded as having a strong commitment to developing their area.

=== National Mandate Party ===
Intsiawati gave the explanation for his decision to join National Mandate Party (PAN) in her fight. "With the National Mandate Party, I went to Senayan so that what I was fighting for was not only a proposal anymore, but also to determine the policy," Instiwati said. On 17 September 2023, she reported that the Zulkifli Hasan's visit to Riau is a show of support for PAN legislative candidates running at all levels. On 26 August 2023, at night, the PAN winning team, Intsiawati, met with its tandem in the Pekanbaru for a coordination and consolidation meeting, with discussion on how to unseat her, who is now holding the DPR RI seat from electoral district Riau 1.

== Personal life ==
On 4 May 1968, Intsiawati Ayus was born in Bengkalis Regency, Riau. Daughter to Datuk H. Asman Yunus (3 December 1941 – 1 October 2015) and the grandson of 4th Pekanbaru Mayor Muhammad Yunus (1 June 1956 – 14 May 1958). From the paternal line, she descended from Sultan Abdul Jalil Alamuddin Syah, also known as the 4th Sultan of Siak from 1766 to 1780.
