= Saleh Djasit =

Indonesian politician (b. 1957)

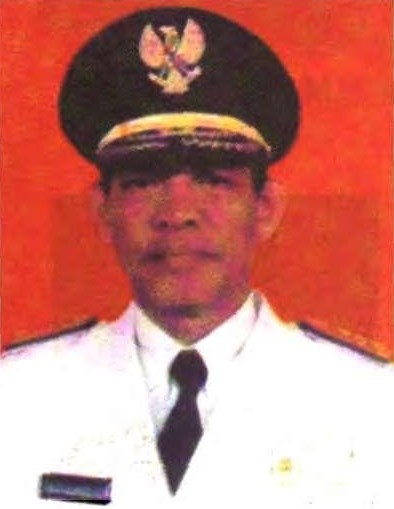
- Djasit as Governor of Riau

Governor of Riau
- In office 21 November 1998 – 21 November 2003
- Preceded by: Soeripto
- Succeeded by: Rusli Zainal

Member of People's Representative Council
- In office 1 October 2004 – 19 March 2008
- In office 1 October 1997 – 21 November 1998

Regent of Kampar
- In office 1986–1996

Personal details
- Born: 13 November 1943 (age 81); Rokan Hilir, Dutch East Indies
- Political party: Golkar

Military service
- Allegiance: Indonesia
- Branch/service: Indonesian Army
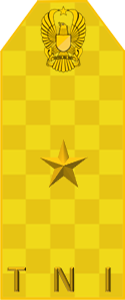
- Rank: Brigadier general

Saleh Djasit (born 13 November 1943) is an Indonesian politician and military officer who served as the governor of Riau between 1998 and 2003, and as a member of the People's Representative Council from 1997 to 1998 and 2004 to 2008. He was also regent of Kampar Regency between 1986 and 1996. He was arrested and sentenced to four years in prison in 2008 for a corruption case, although he was released on parole after 2.5 years.

== Early life ==
Djasit was born in Pujud, within what is today Rokan Hilir Regency of Riau, on 13 November 1943. Until the age of 9, he was homeschooled before he moved to the larger town of Sedinginan where he completed elementary school at age 16. He then moved to Pekanbaru, Padang and later Bandung, where he enrolled at Nahdlatul Ulama University in 1965 to study economics. He did not finish his degree, and instead enrolled as a civilian employee for the Indonesian Army Command and General Staff College. He later enrolled in military education, worked in intelligence, and studied military law.

== Career ==
On 3 April 1986, Djasit, then a lieutenant colonel working as a military prosecutor in South Sulawesi, was assigned to become the regent of Kampar Regency. He held the office for two terms until 1996. He returned to the military legal service upon the end of his term as regent and was promoted to brigadier general on 4 June 1997. He was then appointed as a military member of the People's Representative Council in 1997, starting from 1 October that year. He lobbied for the construction of a hydroelectric power plant, the first in Riau, during his tenure in Kampar. He also oversaw the large-scale establishment of palm oil plantations in the regency.

On 21 November 1998, Djasit was sworn in as Governor of Riau after being elected with 25 of 45 votes. At the time, the political climate in Indonesia was chaotic due to the fall of Suharto, and Djasit was intercepted by dozens of protesters right after the swearing in ceremony. Early in his term, he faced monthly protests. During his term, he also issued a moratorium on permit issuances for sand dredging. In his 2003 reelection bid, however, he was defeated by Rusli Zainal in the legislature's voting, securing just 19 of 54 votes to Zainal's 34.

After his tenure as governor ended, Djasit was elected as a Golkar member into the People's Representative Council following the 2004 election, being sworn in on 1 October 2004.

=== Imprisonment ===
Djasit was designated as a suspect by the Corruption Eradication Commission (KPK) in November 2007, related to the procurement of 20 firetrucks in 2003. He was arrested on 19 March 2008, becoming the first member of DPR to be arrested by KPK. He was sentenced to four years' prison on 28 August 2008, and was fined Rp 200 million. He was released on parole on 16 August 2010, after serving 2.5 years of his sentence.

== Later life ==
Djasit had stated that he intends to publish an autobiography and a book on the history of his hometown Pujud. As of 2022, he remains active politically within Golkar.
