= Arsyadjuliandi Rachman =

Indonesian politician (born 1960)

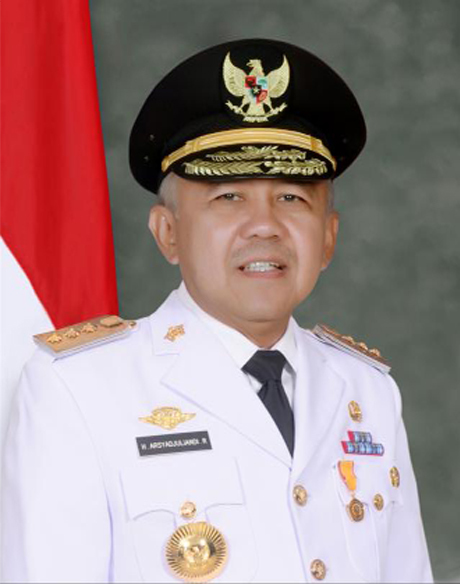
- Rachman as Governor of Riau

Governor of Riau
- In office 25 May 2016 – 20 September 2018; Acting governor since October 2014
- Preceded by: Annas Maamun
- Succeeded by: Wan Thamrin Hasyim

Vice Governor of Riau
- In office 19 February 2014 – 25 May 2016
- Preceded by: Mambang Mit
- Succeeded by: Wan Thamrin Hasyim

Member of People's Representative Council
- Incumbent
- Assumed office 1 October 2019

Personal details
- Born: 8 July 1960 (age 66) Pekanbaru, Riau, Indonesia
- Party: Golkar
- Education: Sebelas Maret University; Oklahoma City University

Arsyadjuliandi Rachman (born 8 July 1960) is an Indonesian politician. He was governor of Riau between 2016 and 2018 and was a member of the House of Representatives between 2019 and 2024. He was previously the province's vice-governor, although he acted in the governor's capacity following Annas Maamun's arrest in 2014.

== Early life and education ==
Rachman was born on 8 July 1960 in Pekanbaru, as the fifth of ten children of Abdul Rachman Syafei, the owner of a bus transport company. He completed primary school in Pekanbaru before moving to Bukittinggi and later Yogyakarta to pursue higher education. Between 1980 and 1985, he studied at Sebelas Maret University in Surakarta, and graduated with a bachelor's degree in agriculture, then an MBA at Oklahoma City University between 1986 and 1987.

== Career ==
In 2009, he was appointed deputy chairman of the Indonesian Chamber of Commerce and Industry (KADIN), having previously been the chairman of Aceh's Chamber of Commerce and Industry. He ran as the running mate of Annas Maamun in the 2013 Riau gubernatorial election, the pair winning with 60.75% of votes after a runoff election. In October 2014, he was appointed as acting governor following Maamun's arrest for bribery charges. He was appointed as full governor on 25 May 2016. He contested the 2018 gubernatorial election, but lost to Syamsuar. He resigned on 20 September 2018 in order to run as candidate for the People's Representative Council in the 2019 legislative election. Rachman proceeded to win a seat representing Riau's 1st electoral district after winning 31,854 votes.
