= Annas Maamun =

Indonesian politician (born 1940)

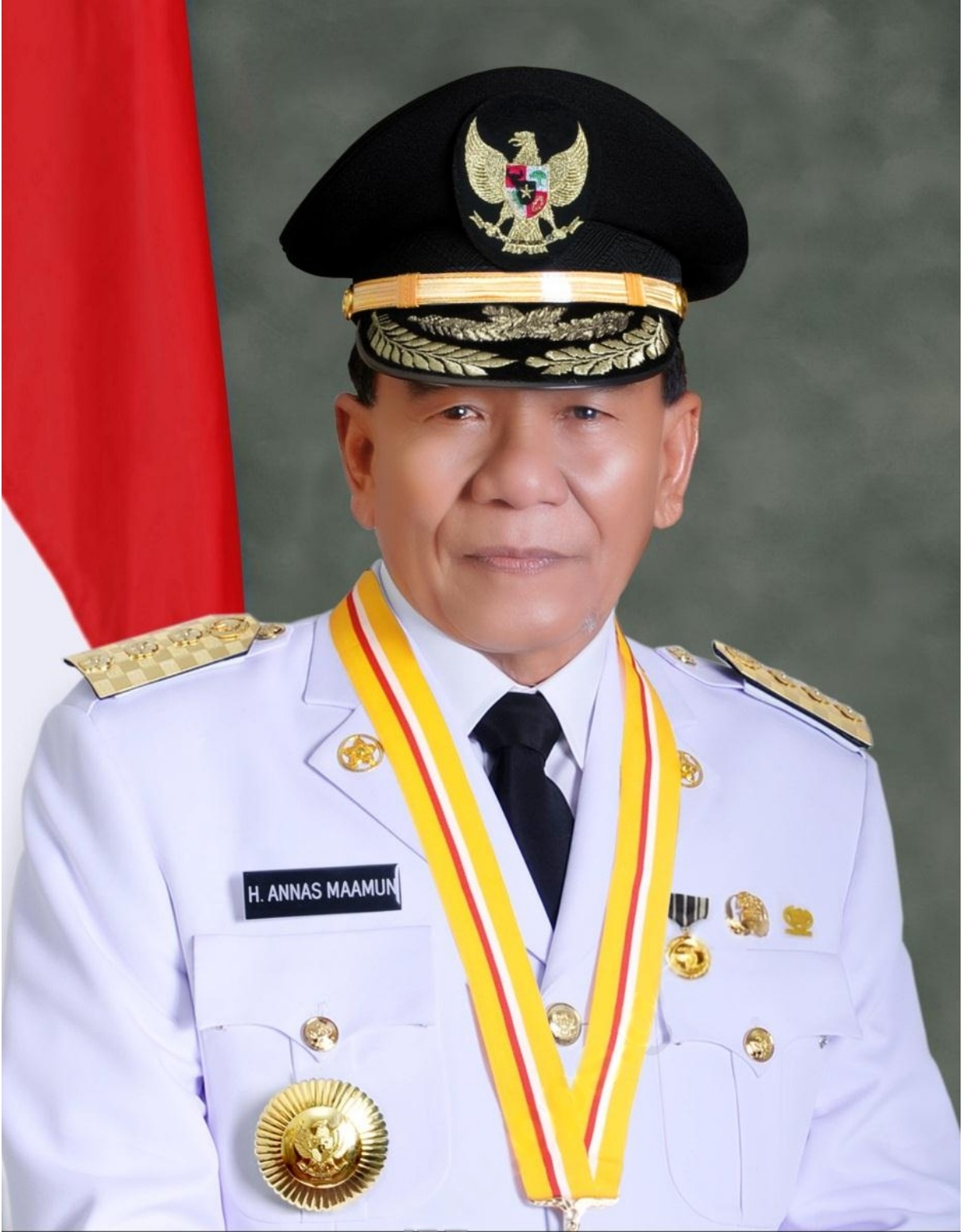
- Maamun as Governor of Riau

Governor of Riau
- In office 19 February 2014 – 29 April 2016 (Note: non-active Governor at 25 September 2024, because he was arrested in Jakarta by the Corruption Eradication Commission (KPK) under charges of receiving bribes related to land function conversion)
- Preceded by: Rusli Zainal
- Succeeded by: Arsyadjuliandi Rachman

Regent of Rokan Hilir
- In office 7 June 2006 – 19 February 2014
- Preceded by: Wan Thamrin Hasyim
- Succeeded by: Suyatno

Personal details
- Born: 17 April 1940 (age 86) Bagansiapiapi, Riau, Dutch East Indies
- Party: Golkar (2014–2021); Nasdem (2021–2023); Ummah (2023-Present)

Annas Maamun (born 17 April 1940) is an Indonesian politician who was imprisoned for corruption who served as governor of Riau between February and September 2014. He was previously the regent of Rokan Hilir Regency between 2006 and 2014. His term as governor was ended by a corruption scandal, which led to him being imprisoned for six years. After his release in 2020, he was once more arrested for a bribery case from his time as governor, and sentenced to another year in prison in 2022.

== Early life and education ==
Maamun was born at Bagansiapiapi on 17 April 1940, and entered public school there. He also studied at public schools in Bengkalis, Tanjung Pinang, and later Padang.

== Career ==
In 1960, Maamun began working as a middle school teacher in Bagansiapiapi, moving to Padang and Pekanbaru before he became a civil servant in the Ministry of Home Affairs in 1969. In 1970, he was assigned to the district office of Bangko, in Bagansiapiapi. He worked in Bangko until 1976, before being reassigned to other offices in Riau and returning to Bangko 1986 to serve briefly as district head. He continued to rise up the ranks in the province's bureaucracy, eventually being elected as a member of Bengkalis Regency's local council in 1997 as a member of Golkar, including as its speaker between 1999 and 2001. He moved to Rokan Hilir Regency's council in 2001, becoming its speaker until 2005.

Maamun ran in Rokan Hilir's local election in 2006, securing 34.64 percent of votes and winning the five-candidate race, and was reelected in 2011. He further ran in Riau's 2013 gubernatorial election, securing 60.75 percent of votes with Arsyadjuliandi Rachman as his running mate. He was sworn in as governor on 19 February 2014. At that time, he was the oldest serving governor in Indonesia.

=== Arrest, release, and rearrest ===
On 25 September 2014, Maamun was arrested in Jakarta by the Corruption Eradication Commission (KPK) under charges of receiving bribes related to land function conversion. He was the third successive governor of Riau to be arrested under corruption charges. On 24 June 2015, the Bandung Anti-corruption Court sentenced him to 6 years of prison and a fine of Rp 200 million. He appealed to the Supreme Court, which increased his sentence to 7 years. However, President Joko Widodo gave him a pardon on 25 October 2019 which reverted his sentence to 6 years, citing his old age.

After his release from prison on 21 September 2020, Maamun joined the NasDem Party in October 2021. However, he was once more arrested by KPK on 30 March 2022, under charges of bribing provincial legislators to approve Riau's 2015 budget. He was sentenced to one year in prison on 28 July 2022. Following his second release, he joined the Ummah Party in 2023.
