= Pasir Pengaraian =

Town in Sumatra, Indonesia

Pasir Pengaraian (ڤاسير ڤڠڬاراين) is a town in Riau Province on the island of Sumatra, Indonesia. It is the administrative capital of both Rokan Hulu Regency and of Rambah District (kecamatan). It has an area of 1.94 km^{2}, and had a population of 4,753 as at mid 2023.
