= University of Riau =

Public university

Universitas Riau
- Universitas Riau
- Motto: Unggul dan Responsif
- Motto in English: Superior and Responsive
- Type: Public
- Established: 1 September 1962
- Affiliations: ASAIHL
- Rector: Dr. Hj. Sri Indarti, S.E., M.Si
- Location: Pekanbaru, Riau, Indonesia; 0.4764°N 101.3806°E
- Colors: Green, yellow, and white
- Nickname: UNRI
- Website: www.unri.ac.id

Universitas Riau (Indonesian: Universitas Riau) is a public university in Pekanbaru, Riau, Indonesia. It was established on 1 September 1962. Dr. Hj. Sri Indarti, S.E., M.Si serves as the Rector of University of Riau.

== Schools ==
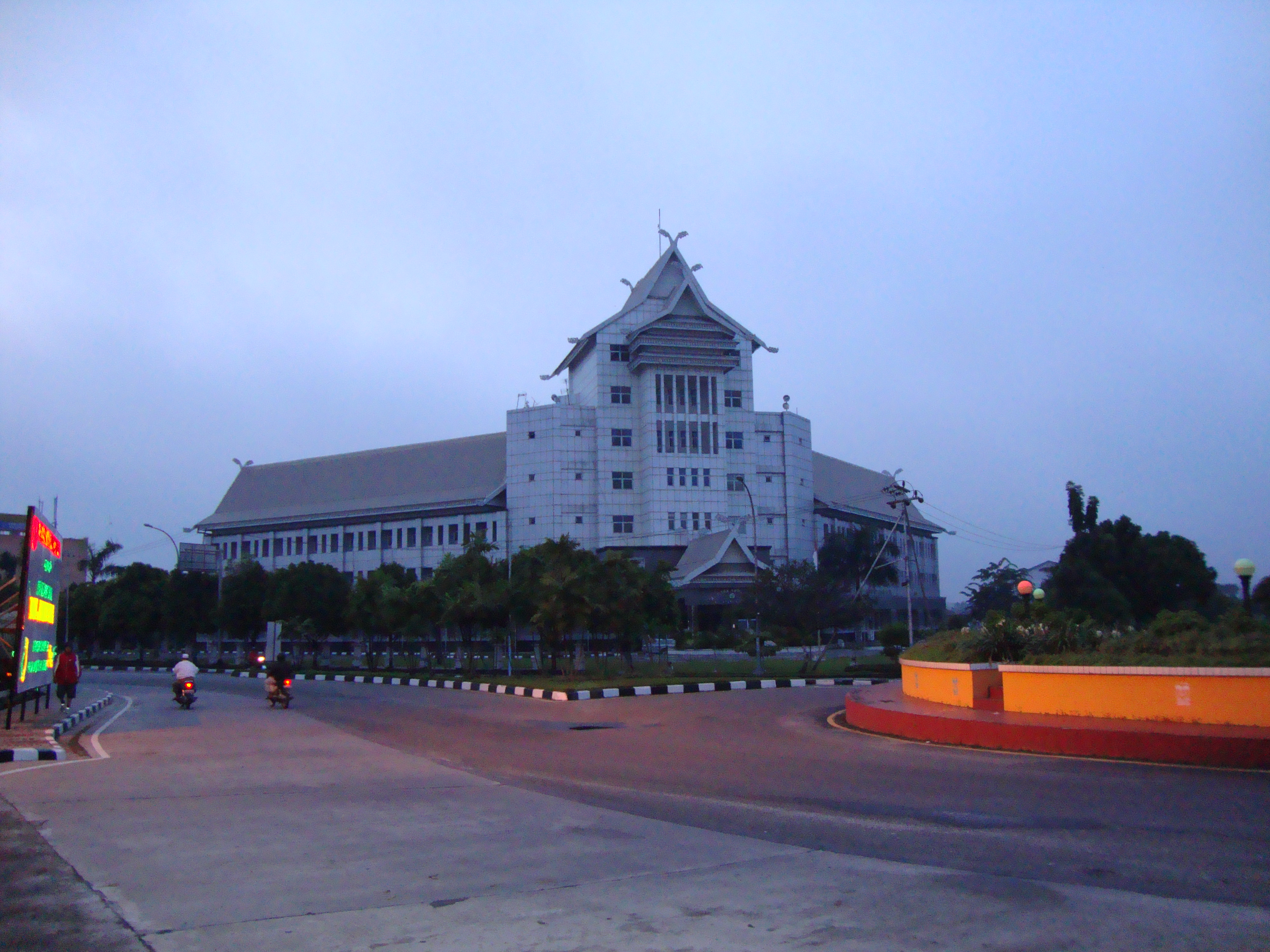
Faculty of Medicine in the Universitas Riau

The university has nine faculties:

- Faculty of Social and Political Sciences
- Faculty of Education and Teacher Training
- Faculty of Agriculture
- Faculty of Engineering
- Faculty of Economy and Business
- Faculty of Mathematics and Natural Sciences
- Faculty of Fishery and Marine
- Faculty of Medicine
- Faculty of Law
