= Rokan Hulu Regency =

Regency in Riau, Indonesia

Rokan Hulu Regency Kabupaten Rokan Hulu
- Regency
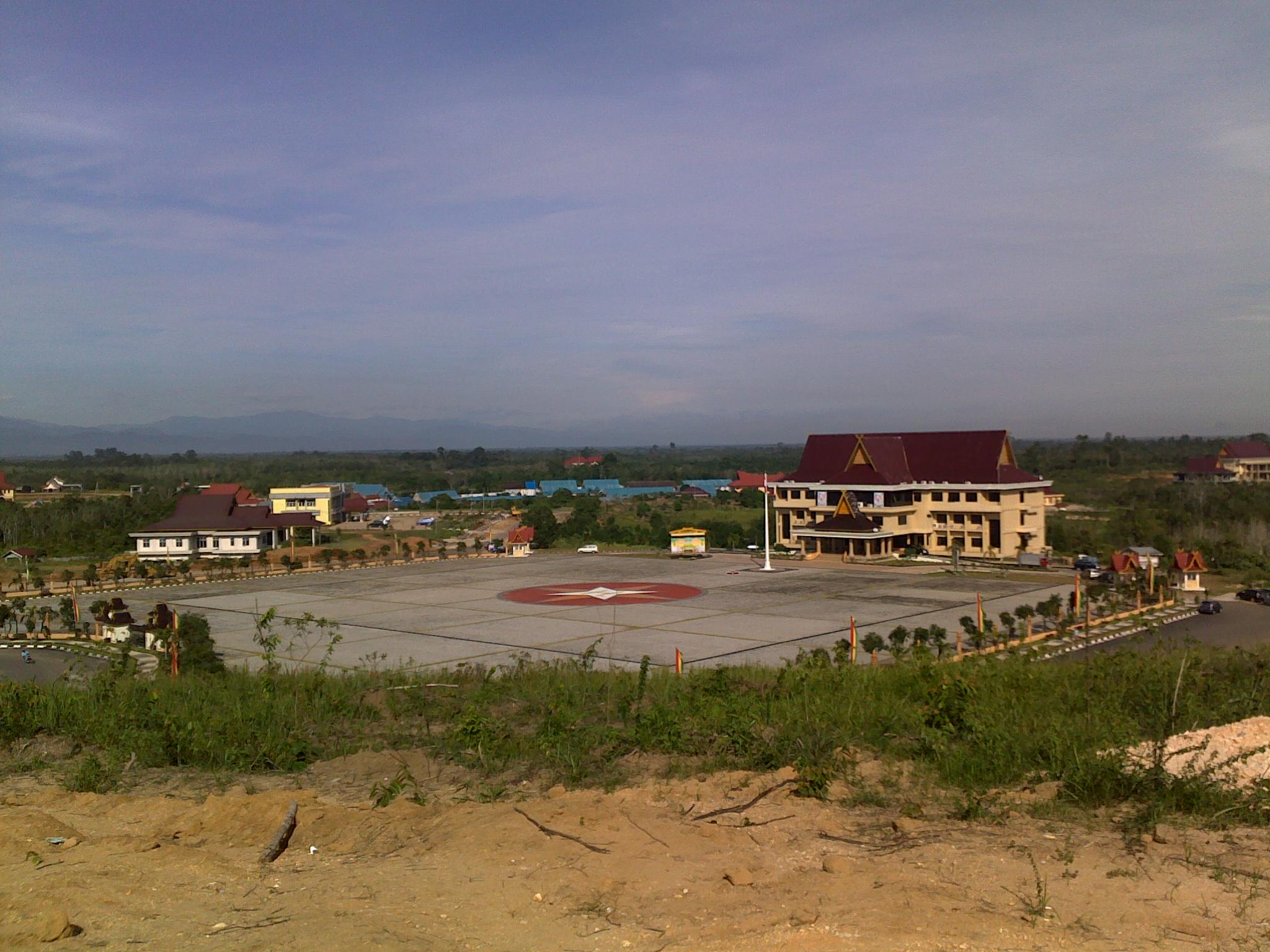
- The Government building complex

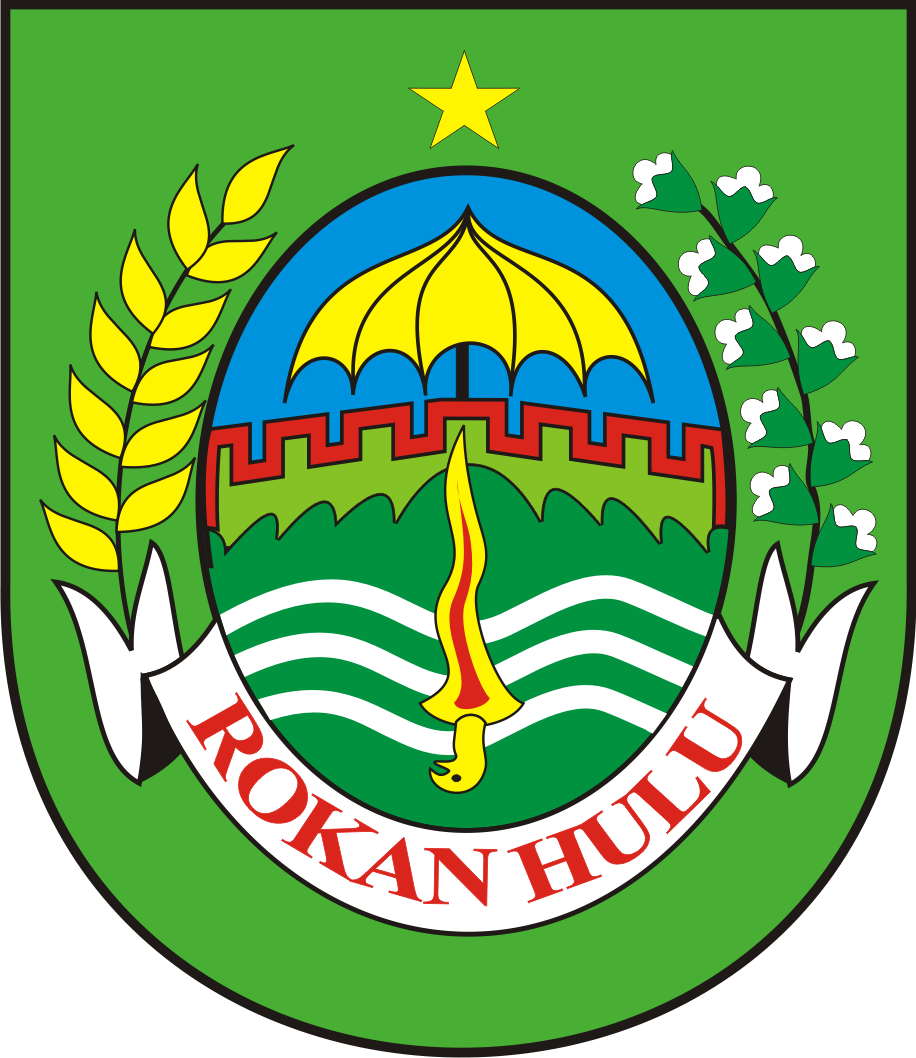
- Coat of arms

- Coordinates: 0°56′N 100°30′E
- Country: Indonesia
- Province: Riau
- Regency seat: Pasir Pengaraian

Government
  - Regent: Anton
  - Vice Regent: Syafaruddin Poti

Area
  - Total: 7,588.13 km^{2} (2,929.79 sq mi)

Population (2024 estimate)
  - Total: 586,994
  - Density: 77.3569/km^{2} (200.353/sq mi)
- Time zone: UTC+7 (WIB)
- Website: rokanhulukab.go.id

Rokan Hulu (lit. Upper Rokan) is a regency (kabupaten) of Riau Province of Indonesia. It is located on the island of Sumatra. Rokan Hulu Regency was created on 4 October 1999 as a result of the division of Kampar Regency, of which it was previously the western 24%. The new Regency was established under Law No. 53 of 1999 and Law No. 11 of 2003 on changes to Law Decree No. 53 of 1999, which is reinforced by the Constitutional Court Decision No. 010 / PUU-1/2004, dated 26 August 2004. It mainly occupies the upper part of the catchment area of the Rokan River, and has an area of 7,588.13 km². It had 474,843 inhabitants at the 2010 Census and 561,385 at the 2020 Census; the official estimate as at mid 2024 was 586,994 (comprising 298,478 males and 288,516 females). The administrative centre of the regency is located at the town of Pasir Pengaraian (with 4,753 inhabitants as at mid 2023) in Rambah District.

== Administrative districts ==
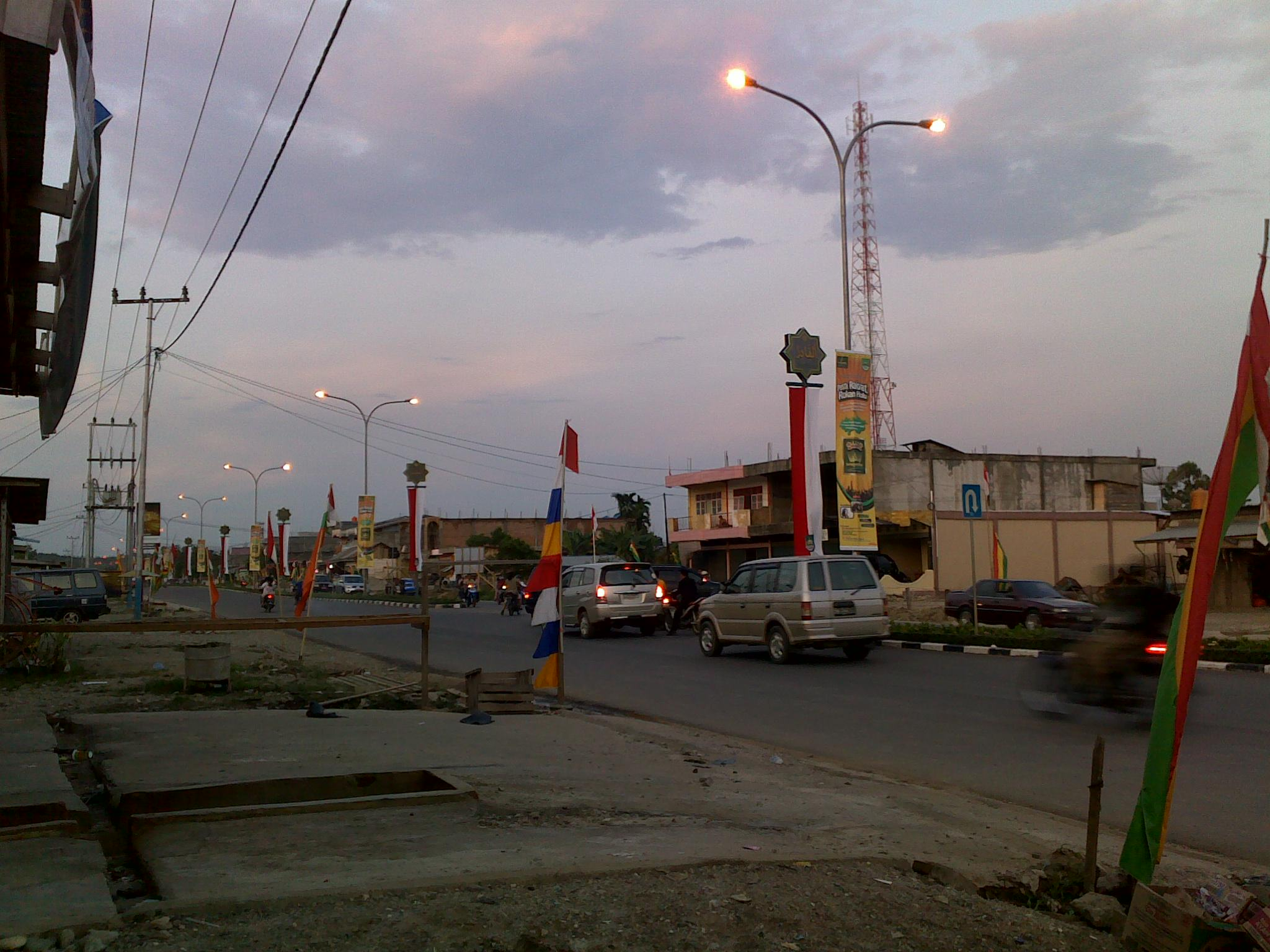
Pasir Pengaraian, the capital of the regency

The regency is divided into sixteen districts (kecamatan), listed below with their populations at the 2010 Census and 2020 Census, together with the official estimates as at mid 2024. The table also includes the locations of the district administrative centres, the number of villages in each district (totaling 139 rural desa and 6 urban kelurahan), and its post code.

Kode Wilayah	Name of District (kecamatan)	Area in km^{2}	Pop'n Census 2010	Pop'n Census 2020	Pop'n Estimate mid 2024	Admin centre	No. of villages	Post code
14.06.02	Rokan IV Koto	952.31	20,284	23,010	24,955	Rokan	14	28551
14.06.16	Pendalian IV Koto	204.24	10,675	12,770	12,632	Pendalian	5	28555
14.06.11	Tandun ^{(a)}	277.64	25,765	30,770	33,102	Tandun	9	28552
14.06.12	Kabun ^{(a)}	355.46	22,166	26,280	28,213	Kabun	6	28554
14.06.01	Ujung Batu	99.27	40,796	49,250	51,768	Ujung Batu	5	28553
14.06.07	Rambah Samo	352.33	27,197	33,940	34,752	Rambah Samo	14	28565
14.06.03	Rambah	343.23	41,348	51,050	54,332	Pasir Pengaraian	14	28560
14.06.08	Rambah Hilir (Lower Rambah)	279.16	34,375	40,440	41,714	Muara Rumbai	13	28561
14.06.10	Bangun Purba	150.15	15,612	18,890	20,245	Tangun	7	28557
14.06.04	Tambusai	775.16	53,067	62,020	61,150	Dalu-Dalu	12	28558
14.06.09	Tambusai Utara (North Tambusai)	951.48	73,874	86,780	87,915	Rantau Kasai	11	28662
14.06.05	Kepenuhan	502.81	20,500	26,620	29,120	Kota Tengah	10	28563
14.06.15	Kepenuhan Hulu (Upper Kepenuhan)	297.33	15,650	18,120	19,083	Kepenuhan Hulu	5	28564
14.06.06	Kunto Darussalam	777.64	39,425	44,880	46,504	Kota Lama	10	28556
14.06.14	Pagaran Tapah Darussalam	150.46	14,683	11,810	12,295	Pagaran Tapah	3	28550
14.06.13	Bonai Darussalam	1,119.49	19,426	26,070	29,214	Sontang	7	28559
	Totals	7,588.13	474,843	561,385	586,994	Pasir Pengaraian	145	

Notes: (a) Tandun and Rabun Districts form a long salient in the southeast of the Regency into Kampar Regency.
