= Siak =

Siak may refer to:

- Siak Regency, a regency of Riau, Sumatra, Indonesia
  - Siak Sri Indrapura, capital of the regency
- Siak River, a river in Sumatra, Indonesia
- Sultanate of Siak Sri Indrapura a kingdom in Siak Regency from 1723 to 1946
- PS Siak, a football club based in Siak Regency
- Siunia dynasty, alternatively known as Siak, a dynasty that ruled part of what is now Armenia
- Asiagh (असियाग) (Siak (सियाक)), a gotra/clan of Jats found in India
- Eric Low Siak Meng (born 1948), Singaporean Chinese politician
