= Siak Bridge =

Indonesian bridge that crosses the Siak River

Tengku Agung Sultanah Latifah Bridge Jembatan Tengku Agung Sultanah Latifah
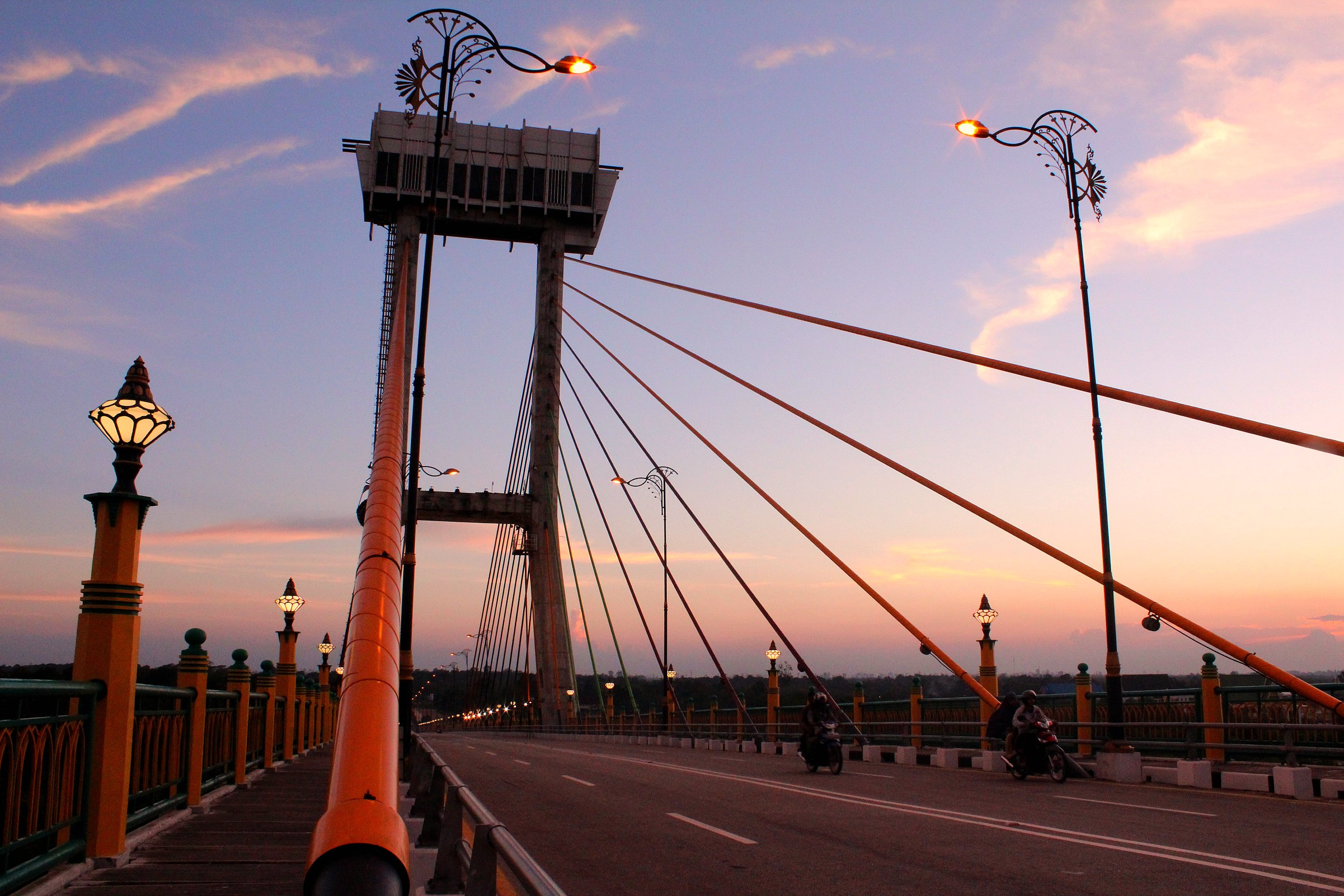
- The bridge as seen in 2012
- Coordinates: 0°48′28″N 102°01′35″E
- Carries: 4 lanes
- Crosses: Siak River
- Locale: Siak Regency, Riau

Characteristics
- Design: 2001
- Total length: 1,196 metres (3,924 ft)
- Width: 16.95 metres (56 ft)
- Height: 23 metres (75 ft)

History
- Construction start: 2002
- Construction cost: Rp277,65 billion
- Inaugurated: 11 Agustus 2007

Location
- Interactive map of Tengku Agung Sultanah Latifah Bridge

The Tengku Agung Sultanah Latifah Bridge, also known as the Siak Bridge, is a bridge located at the town of Siak Sri Indrapura in Siak Regency, Riau, Indonesia. The bridge crosses over the Siak River and is crucial to the development of Siak Sri Indrapura, which has two land sides, and the bridge connects these sides.

The bridge is also a link between the location of the Siak Regent's Office in Benteng Hulu Village in Mempura District and the location of the Siak Regency DPRD Building in Rawang Air Putih Village, which are separated by the Siak River. Apart from that, the bridge was built with the aim of facilitating the flow of transportation between Siak Regency and Pekanbaru so that there is an alternative route by land in addition to the river.

The bridge has become one of the icons and mainstay tourist attractions of Siak Regency since it was inaugurated on August 11, 2007, by the then-president of the Republic of Indonesia, Susilo Bambang Yudhoyono.

== Naming ==
The official name of the bridge, "Tengku Agung Sultanah Latifah", is taken from the title of Tengku Syarifah Mariam binti Fadyl, the consort of Sultan Syarif Kasim II, the last sultan in the Kingdom of Siak who ruled from 1915 to 1946.

== Structure ==
The bridge is 1,196 meters long, 16.95 meters wide and has two 2.25-meter wide sidewalks flanking the right and left sides of the bridge. The height of the bridge reaches 23 meters above the water surface of the Siak River which is around 300 meters wide and can support a load of 28 tons. On top of the bridge stand two towers each 80 meters high with a size of 10 X 5 m², which are used for theater dioramas and restaurants, which are equipped with two lifts to reach the top of the tower. The bridge, which is designed to last for more than 100 years, was built using a cable stayed system, with modern construction.

== Development ==
The bridge was designed since 2001 by a team of experts from the Bandung Institute of Technology. The construction of the bridge began on December 27, 2002 with the signing of a work contract agreement between the Siak Regent and the HK-PP Consortium contractor, which is a consortium of the two largest BUMNs, namely PT Hutama Karya and PT Pembangunan Perumahan.

The cost required to build the bridge reached Rp.277.65 billion, which was purely taken from the Siak Regency APBD funds.

== See also ==
- List of bridges in Indonesia
