= Tengku Agung Syarifah Latifah =

Syarifah Latifah

Queen Consort of Siak
- Tenure: 27 October 1912– 3 November 1929
- Successor: Tengku Syarifah Fadlun
- Born: 1896; Tanjung Pura, Sultanate of Langkat, Dutch East Indies
- Died: 2 November 1929 (aged 32–33)
- Spouse: Syarif Kasim II (m. 1912)
- Father: Tengku Pangeran Embung Jaya Setia
- Mother: Tengku Aisiah

Tengku Agung Syarifah Latifah (1896 – 2 November 1929) was a queen consort of Syarif Kasim II and a prominent figure from Riau who advocated for women's emancipation and education. She was known as the founder of the first women's school in Riau.

== Early life and education ==
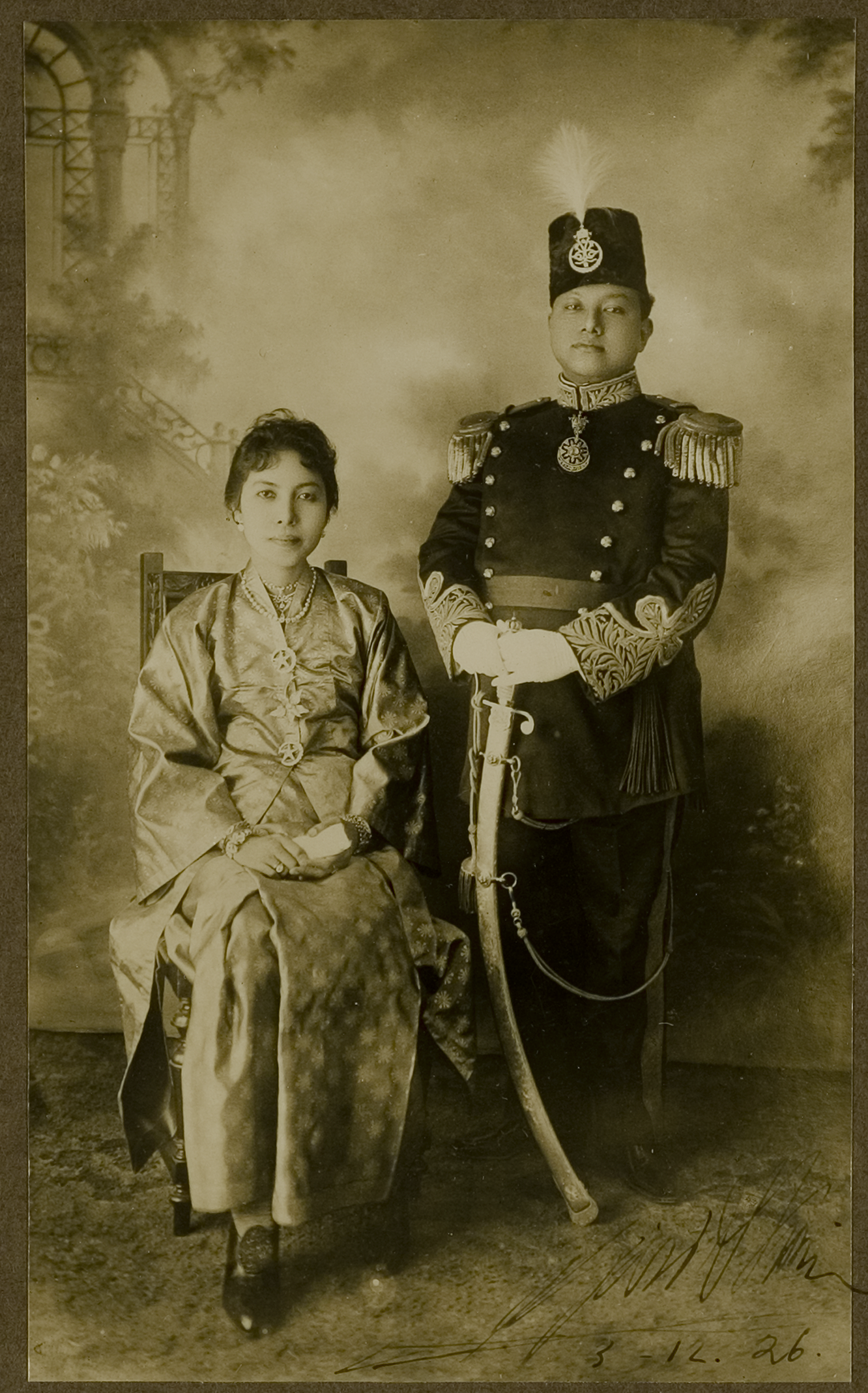
Sultan Syarif Kasim II and Syarifah Latifah

Syarifah was born in 1896 in Tanjung Pura into a noble family. Her father, Tengku Pangeran Embung Jaya Setia, was a deputy of the Sultan of Langkat in Luhak Langkat Hilir, and her mother, Tengku Aisiah, was the sister of Sultan Musa Langkat.

She received her education at the Sultanate of Langkat Palace until she reached the age of maturity. Upon reaching maturity, she entered a period of seclusion, causing her to stop schooling and spend her time in isolation. On October 27, 1912, she married Sultan Syarif Kasim II in Tanjung Pura. After their marriage, she was appointed as the queen consort of the sultan. On March 3, 1915, Syarifah received the title of Tengku Agung when her husband was appointed as the Sultan of Siak.

== Establishing school ==
Syarifah often accompanied her husband during visits. On a visit to Medan, where her husband met East Sumatra Resident, Syarifah saw that women could work at government offices. This was vastly different in Siak, where women's activities were limited to cooking and serving their husbands.

Seeing the progress of women's rights in Medan, Syarifah initiated the establishment of women's schools to empower women's lives so that they could be equal to men. She founded a women's school named Sultanah Latifah School in 1927. This women's school was the first women's school in Riau. Sultanah Latifah School just only had its own building in 1928.

Syarifah designed the curriculum for Sultanah Latifah School. The school's education system followed the Western style. In the school, the students learned household management skills, handicraft skills, hygiene, and weaving skills. Weaving skills were a distinctive subject of this school. The school also accepts students from various backgrounds, ranging from the children of sultans and queens, ordinary people living in villages not far from the palace to orphans.

== Death ==
Syarifah died on November 2, 1929. There are several versions of her death, ranging from abdominal illness, accident, to a conspiracy by the Dutch colonial government. She was buried in the tomb complex of Sultan Syarif Kasim II and his queen.

== Personal life ==
From her marriage to the sultan, Syarifah did not have any children.

== Legacies ==
In 2007, the Siak Regency Government named the bridge Tengku Agung Sultanah Latifah Bridge as a form of high appreciation. Additionally, her name was also immortalized as the name of a palace in Siak.

== Bibliography ==
- Wilaela, Wilaela; Ghafur, Abdul; Hasbullah, Hasbullah; Widiarto, Widiarto (2018). Prosopografi Tokoh Perempuan Pendidik di Riau (1926-2016). Pekanbaru: CV Asa Riau. ISBN 978-602-6302-60-1.
