= Kampung Dalam =

Kampung Dalam is a town in Siak Regency of Riau Province in Indonesia, on the island of Sumatra. The town lies on the west bank of the Siak River, opposite to the Siak Sri Indrapura Palace complex on the east bank in Mempura District. The river at this point makes a wide swing around Kampung Dalam and its adjacent communities of Kampung Rempak and Suak Lanjut before heading north towards the Malacca Strait. Kampung Dalam, which is the administrative centre of Siak District (kecamatan), and Kampung Rempak are both considered urban kelurahan, while Suak Lanjut has the status of a desa within the district. Their areas and populations as at mid 2023 are set out below.

Kode Wilayah	Name of kelurahan or desa	Area in km^{2}	Pop'n Estimate mid 2023
14.08.01.1001	Kampung Dalam	5.90	8,074
14.08.01.1002	Kampung Rempak	40.15	8,772
14.08.01.2014	Suak Lanjut	4.02	2,564
	Totals	50.07	19,410
