= Tengku Syarifah Fadlun =

Syarifah Fadlun

Queen Consort of Siak
- Tenure: 23 January 1930 – 1950
- Predecessor: Tengku Syarifah Latifah
- Born: 1913; Tanjung Pura, Sultanate of Langkat, Dutch East Indies
- Died: 13 May 1988 (aged 74-75)
- Spouse: Sultan Syarif Kasim II (m. 1930–1950) Tuanku Mahmud (m. 1950–1958)
- Father: Tengku Pangeran Embung Jaya Setia

Tengku Maharatu Syarifah Fadlun, known as Tengku Maharatu (1913 – ?), was the second queen consort of Sultan Syarif Kasim II and education figure from Riau.

== Early life ==
Syarifah was born in Tanjung Pura in 1913. Her father, Tengku Pangeran Embung Jaya Setia, was a Langkat's nobleman, and her mother was the sister of Sultan Musa. She was the sister of Syarifah Latifah.

== Queen Consort of Sultan Syarif Kasim II ==
Syarifah Fadlun married to Sultan Syarif Kasim II on 23 January 1930, one year after the death of Syarifah Latifah. She was granted the title tengku maharatu title in 1930 with different dates according to two versions. Some say she received the title on 28 June 1930, while other sources mention 6 June 1930. The couple divorced in 1950. When she became the sultan's husband, Syarifah did not have any children.

=== Managing Annisa Madrasa dan Sultanah Latifah School ===
In May 1929, Sultan Syarif Kasim II established a religious women's school which was Annisa Madrasa. Syarifah Fadlun played roles on this madrasa as its manager. As a manager, she exempted the students from tuition fees. Other than that, she collaborated with other religious schools to improve the quality of education. In 1941, together with her husband, Syarifah Fadlun visited Bukittinggi to meet Rahmah el Yunusiyah, and it was from there that the cooperation between Annisa Madrasa and Diniyah Putri Padang Panjang was established.

Through cooperation between Annisa Madrasa and Diniyah Putri, Annisa Madrasa's outstanding students could continue their higher education at the aliyah level in the diniyah school managed by Rahmah El Yunusiyah. By studying at the diniyah school, the students could become teachers at Annisa Madrasa. Additionally, Annisa Madrasa received teachers from Padang Panjang. Inspired by Diniyah Putri, Syarifah designed a curriculum for her madrasah that aligned with the diniyah, where the lessons were not limited to religious studies but also included general knowledge.

Not only did Syarifah manage the madrasa, but she also managed Sultanah Latifah School after the death of Tengku Agung Syarifah Latifah. She took the initiative to build dormitories for Annisa Madrasa and Sultanah Latifah School students and proposed the establishment of a kindergarten.

=== Siak Woven Fabric ===
Syarifah was also involved in the development of Siak woven fabric. She taught local women weaving skills with the aim of elevating their status.

=== Indonesian National Revolution ===
After the news of the Proclamation of Indonesian Independence reached Siak, Syarifah, together with her husband, supported the struggle for Indonesia's independence. Syarifah contributed to Indonesia by sewing together and mending the torn Dutch flag into the Indonesian flag. The flag she sewed was raised during a public meeting held in Siak.

Together with her husband, Syarifah was also reported to have donated 13 million guilders and the gold she possessed for the struggle for Indonesian independence. Apart from that, Syarifah also attached the red and white emblem to the uniforms of the People's Security Army (TKR).

== Later life ==
After divorcing Syarif Kasim II, Syarifah married Tuanku Mahmud, who lived in Jakarta. Tuanku Mahmud died of a heart attack on 2 November 1958, and Syarif Kasim II expressed his condolences. After Tuanku Mahmud’s death, Syarifah Fadlun left with her adopted daughter, Tengku Adibah, and her husband, Ishak, for Selangor to engage in trade. The Queen of Selangor accepted them and stayed for several days at the Shah Alam Palace. After several months, they moved to Jambi and then returned to Jakarta a few years later.

In 1980, Syarifah sued Wan Galib for defamation against her. In her late life, she suffered from leukemia and had to undergo blood transfusions twice a week. She died on 13 May 1988 in Jakarta. The Governor of Riau, Imam Munandar, asked the family to allow her body to be brought to Siak to be buried beside Syarif Kasim II. However, they refused Munandar's order as Syarifah had expressed her will to be buried in Jakarta. A traditional Malay royal funeral ceremony was held at Tanah Kusir Cemetery on 14 May.

== Legacies ==
In 2023, a cultural figure from Riau named Datuk O.K. Nizami Jamil wrote an autobiography titled "Tengku Maharatu." Her name was also used for a building in front of the Siak Palace, Tengku Maharatu Building.

== Bibliography ==
- Wilaela, Wilaela; Ghafur, Abdul; Hasbullah, Hasbullah; Widiarto, Widiarto (2018). Prosopografi Tokoh Perempuan Pendidik di Riau (1926-2016). Pekanbaru: CV Asa Riau. ISBN 978-602-6302-60-1.
