= List of sovereign states in the 1780s =

== Sovereign states ==
=== A ===
Aachen – Free Imperial City of Aachen
Capital: Aachen

Andorra – Principality of Andorra
Capital: Andorra la Vella

Anhalt-Bernburg – Principality of Anhalt-Bernburg
Capital: Bernburg

Anhalt-Bernburg-Schaumburg-Hoym – Principality of Anhalt-Bernburg-Schaumburg-Hoym
Capital: Hoym

Anhalt-Dessau – Principality of Anhalt-Dessau
Capital: Dessau

Anhalt-Köthen – Principality of Anhalt-Köthen
Capital: Köthen

Anhalt-Zerbst – Principality of Anhalt-Zerbst
Capital: Zerbst

Anholt – County of Anholt
Capital: Anholt

Augsburg – Prince-Bishopric of Augsburg
Capital: Dillingen an der Donau

Austria – Archduchy of Austria
Capital: Vienna

=== B ===
Baden – Margraviate of Baden

Basel – Prince-Bishopric of Basel
Capital: Porrentruy

Brixen – Prince-Bishopric of Brixen
Capital: Brixen

=== C ===
Cleves – Duchy of Cleves
Capital: Cleves

China – Great Qing

Cologne – Electorate of Cologne
Capital: Bonn

Comancheria – Nʉmʉnʉʉ Sookobitʉ

=== D ===
Dutch Republic – Republic of the Seven United Netherlands
Capital: The Hague

=== F ===
France – Kingdom of France
Capital: Versailles

Frankfurt – Free Imperial City of Frankfurt
Capital: Frankfurt

=== G ===
Genoa – Republic of Genoa
Capital: Genoa

Great Britain
Capital: London

=== I ===
Ireland – Kingdom of Ireland

=== K ===
Korea – Kingdom of Great Joseon

=== L ===
Liège – Prince-Bishopric of Liège
Capital: Liège

Lucca – Most Serene Republic of Lucca
Capital: Lucca

Lübeck – Free Imperial City of Lübeck
Capital: Lübeck

=== M ===
Mainz – Electorate of Mainz
Capital: Mainz

Massa and Carrara – Duchy of Massa and Carrara
Capital: Massa

Mecklenburg-Schwerin – Duchy of Mecklenburg-Schwerin
Capital: Schwerin

Mecklenburg-Strelitz – Duchy of Mecklenburg-Strelitz
Capital: Neustrelitz

Memmingen – Free Imperial City of Memmingen
Capital: Memmingen

Moldavia – Principality of Moldavia
Capital: Iași

Morocco – Sultanate of Morocco
Capital: Fes

Münster – Prince-Bishopric of Münster

Mughal Empire

=== N ===
Naples – Kingdom of Naples and Sicily
Capital: Naples

Najran – Principality of Najran
Capital: Najran

Nepal – Kingdom of Nepal
Capital: Kathmandu

Netherlands – Republic of the Seven United Netherlands

=== O ===
Oldenburg – Duchy of Oldenburg
Capital: Oldenburg

Ottoman Empire
Capital: Constantinople

Osnabrück – Prince-Bishopric of Osnabrück
Capital: Osnabrück

Oyo Empire
Capital: Oyo-Ile

=== P ===
Paderborn – Prince-Bishopric of Paderborn
Capital: Paderborn

Papal States – State of the Church
Capital: Rome

Passau – Prince-Bishopric of Passau
Capital: Passau

Persia
Capital: Shiraz

- Zand dynasty (to 1789)
- Sublime State of Persia (from 1789)

Piombino – Principality of Piombino
Capital: Piombino

Portugal – Kingdom of Portugal
Capital: Lisbon

Prussia – Kingdom of Prussia
Capital: Berlin

=== R ===
Regensburg – Prince-Bishopric of Regensburg
Capital: Regensburg

Russia – Russian Empire
Capital: Saint Petersburg

=== S ===
Salzburg – Prince-Archbishopric of Salzburg
Capital: Salzburg

San Marino – Most Serene Republic of San Marino
Capital: San Marino

Sardinia – Kingdom of Sardinia
Capital: Turin

Saxony – Electorate of Saxony
Capital: Dresden

Siak Sri Indrapura – Sultanate of Siak Sri Indrapura
Capital: Siak Sri Indrapura

→ Spain – Kingdom of Spain
Capital: Madrid

=== T ===
Thonburi – Kingdom of Thonburi (until 1782)
Capital: Thonburi

Trent – Prince-Bishopric of Trent
Capital: Trento

Trier – Electorate of Trier
Capital: Trier

=== U ===
Ulm – Free Imperial City of Ulm
Capital: Ulm

United States

- United States (to March 1, 1781)
- The United States of America (from March 1, 1781 to March 4, 1789)
- United States of America (from March 4, 1789)

=== V ===
Venice – Most Serene Republic of Venice

=== W ===
Württemberg – Duchy of Württemberg
Capital: Stuttgart

Würzburg – Prince-Bishopric of Würzburg
Capital: Würzburg

== Non-sovereign territories ==
=== Denmark ===
- Danish West Indies
  Capital: Christiansted

=== Dutch East India Company ===
- Dutch Cape Colony – Cape Colony
  Capital: Cape Town

=== Great Britain ===
- British America – British America and the British West Indies (until September 3, 1783)

=== Portugal ===
- Brazil – State of Brazil
  Capital: Rio de Janeiro

=== Spain ===
- New Spain – Viceroyalty of New Spain
  Capital: Mexico City
- New Granada – Viceroyalty of New Granada
  Capital: Santa Fe de Bogotá
- Peru – Viceroyalty of Peru
  Capital: Lima
- Río de la Plata – Viceroyalty of the Río de la Plata
  Capital: Buenos Aires
