= Siak Sri Indrapura Palace =

Siak Palace
- Istana Siak Sri Inderapura
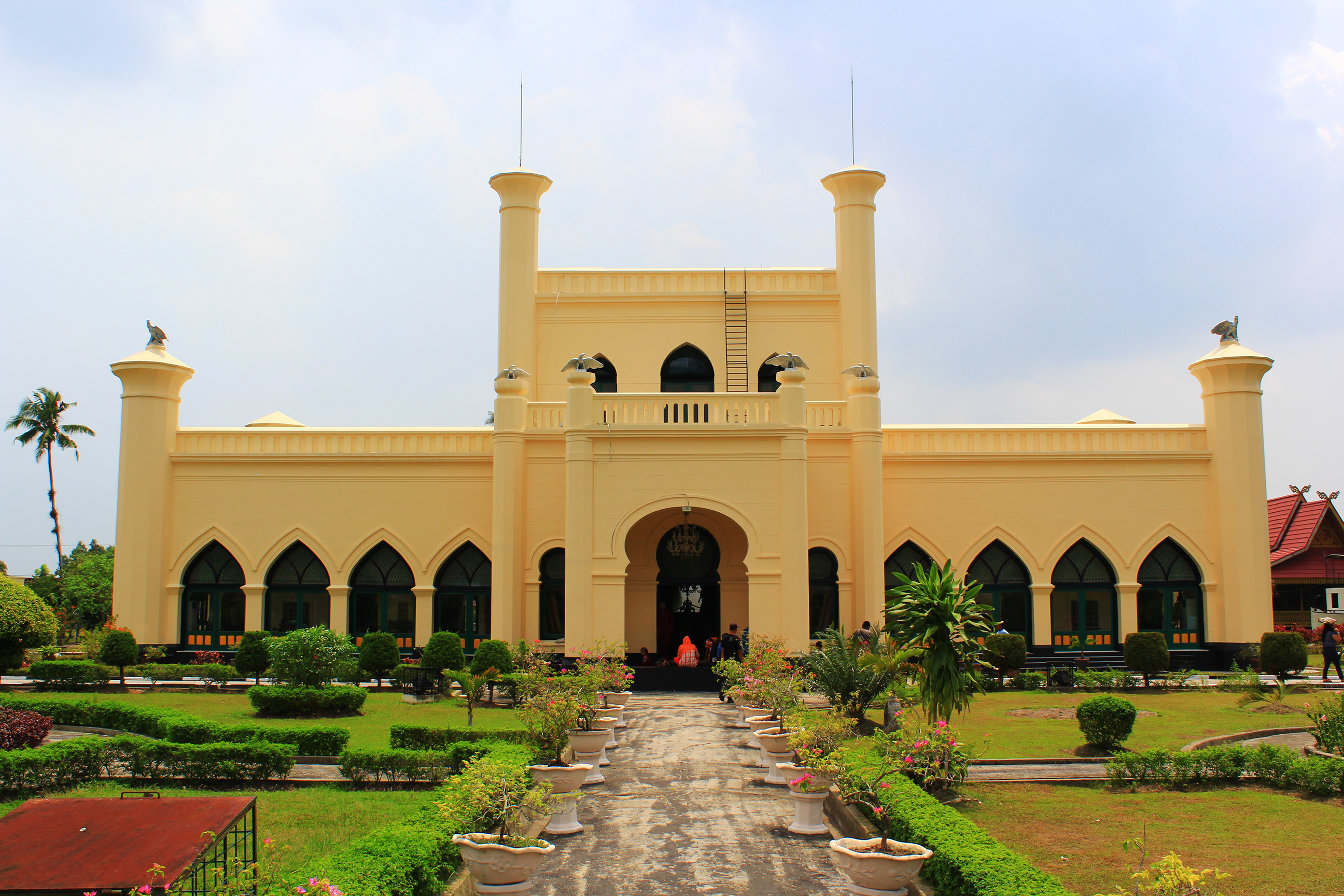
- Interactive map of the Siak Palace area

General information
- Type: Palace
- Location: Jalan Sultan Syarif Kasim, Siak, Riau, Indonesia
- Coordinates: 0.794810°N 102.048985°E
- Construction started: 1889
- Completed: 1893
- Owner: Sultanate of Siak Sri Indrapura

Technical details
- Floor area: 1000 m²

Website
- http://siakkab.go.id/istana-siak/

Siak Sri Indrapura Palace or Siak Palace (Indonesian: Istana Siak Sri Inderapura or Indonesian: Istana Asserayah Hasyimiah or Indonesian: Istana Matahari Timur) is an istana (royal palace) of the Sultanate of Siak Sri Indrapura that is located in Siak Regency, Riau Province, on the island of Sumatra, Indonesia. The palace is now transformed into a museum.

The palace complex has an area of about 32,000 square metres consisting of 4 palaces namely Istana Siak, Istana Lima, Istana Padjang, and Istana Baru. Each of the palaces including Siak Palace itself has an area of 1,000 square meters.

== History ==
The Moorish-style palace, which is now a museum located 120 kilometres (75 mi) downstream on the Siak river from Pekanbaru, and in Mempura District, was built by the 11th sultan, Syarif Hasyim Abdul Jalil Syarifuddin of Sultanate of Siak Sri Indrapura in 1889. The architecture of the palace has European influences that blend harmoniously with the Malay and Moorish elements. Before constructing the palace the Sultan traveled Netherlands and Germany, even some of the furniture was brought from Europe.

There is a myth related with the foundation. It is said that while the Sultan and his dignitaries were discussing the project, suddenly appeared a white dragon on the surface of the river Siak. The presence of the dragon was interpreted as a sign of blessing of the project and auspicious for the greatness of the kingdom. To immortalize the dragon, the Sultan made it the official emblem of the kingdom. The pillars of the palace were decorated with ornaments in the form of dragons.

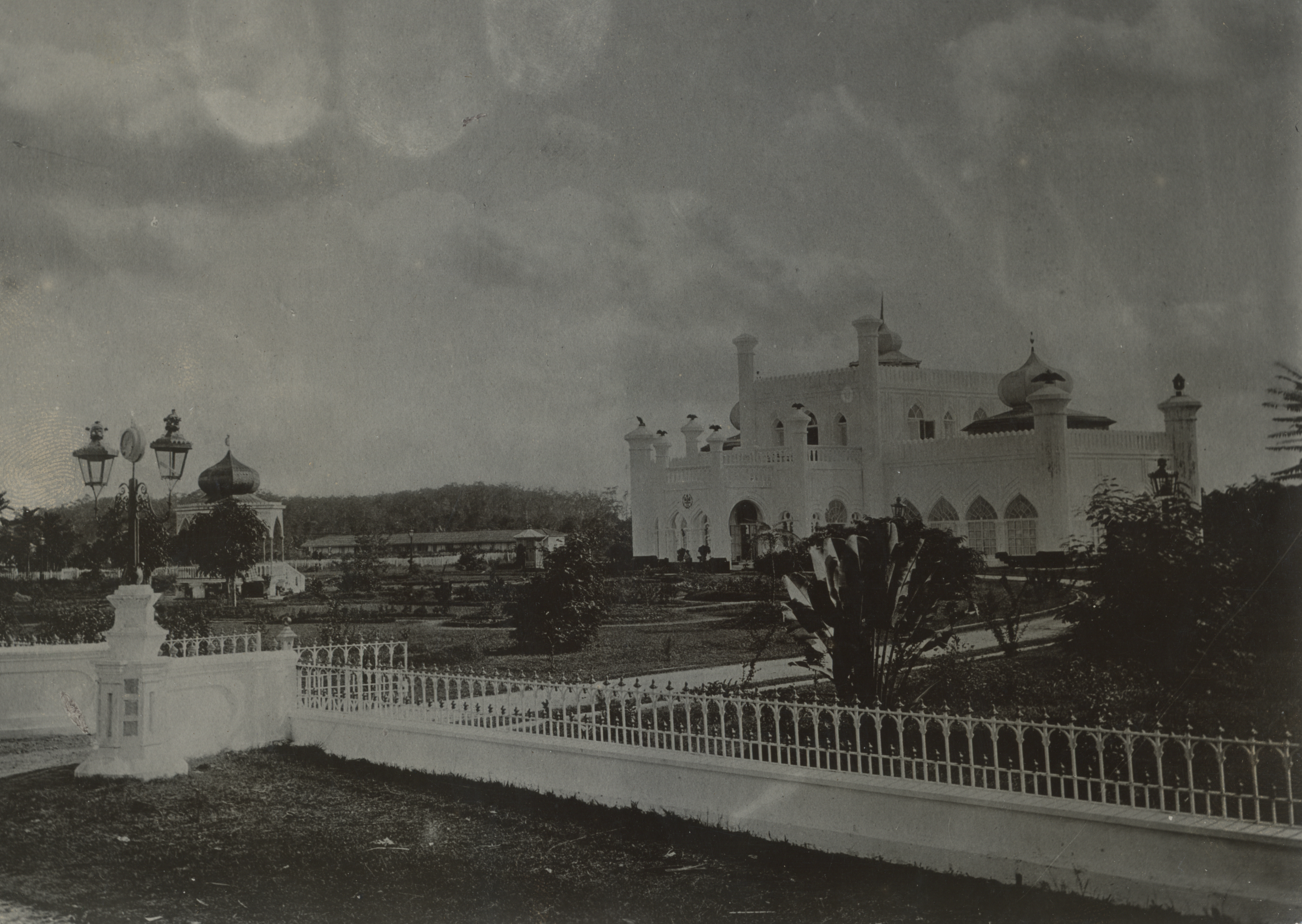
The palace circa 1905

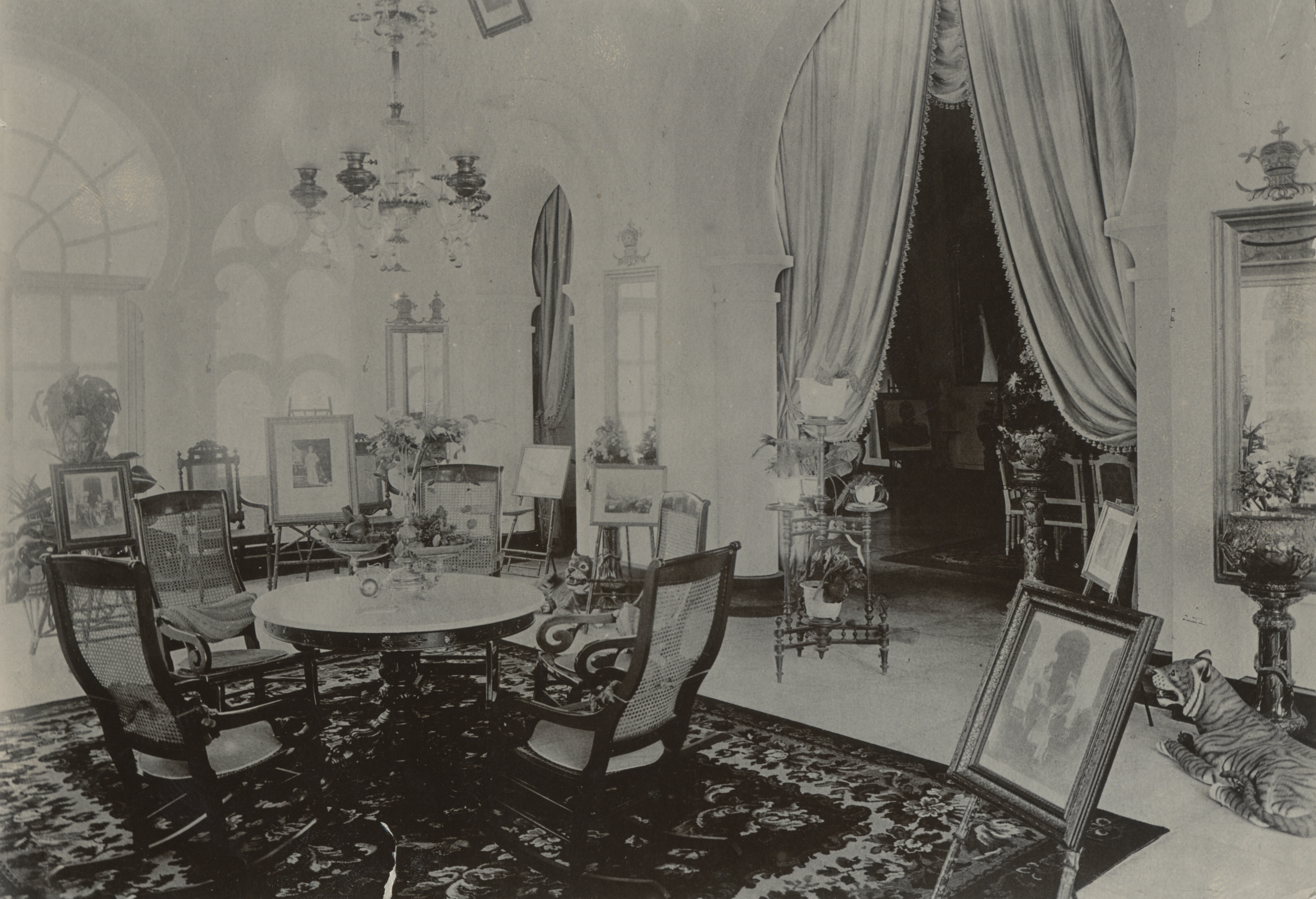
Interior of the palace

The palace contains royal ceremonial objects, such as a gold-plated crown set with diamonds, a golden throne and personal objects of Sultan Syarif Qasyim and his wife, such as the "Komet", a multi-centennial musical instrument which is said to have been made only two copies in the world. Komet still works, and is used to play works by composers such as Beethoven, Mozart and Strauss.

Siak Palace has Malay, Arabic and European architecture. The building consists of two floors. The lower floor is divided into six courtrooms: The guest lounge, the living room of honor, the male living room, the living room for women, one room on the right is the courtroom, also used for the party room. The upper floor is divided into nine rooms, serves to rest the Sultan as well as the guests of the palace. At the top of the building there are six eagle statues as a symbol of courage. While on the court yard can still be seen eight cannons spread to various sides of the palace yard, then on the left rear of the palace there is a small building that was used as a temporary prison . A courtroom, the "Balairung Sari" (the flower room) and royal cemetery also part of palace complex.

== See also ==
- List of museums and cultural institutions in Indonesia
- About the Siak Sri Indrapura Palace and his history (only in indonesian)
