= Perawang =

Town in Riau Province, Indonesia

Perawang is a town (kelurahan) in Siak Regency within Riau Province of Indonesia, on the island of Sumatra. Perawang is the administrative centre of Tualang District (kecamatan) and had 36,066 inhabitants as at mid 2023, while the neighbouring suburbs of Perawang Barat (West Perawang) desa with 32,960 inhabitants to the west of the town and Tualang desa with 18,569 inhabitants to the south of the town form an urban area with some 90,000 population in mid 2023.
