= Giam Siak Kecil-Bukit Batu Bioreserve =

Biosphere reserve in Riau Province, Sumatra, Indonesia

Coordinates: 1°15′36″N 101°44′13″E

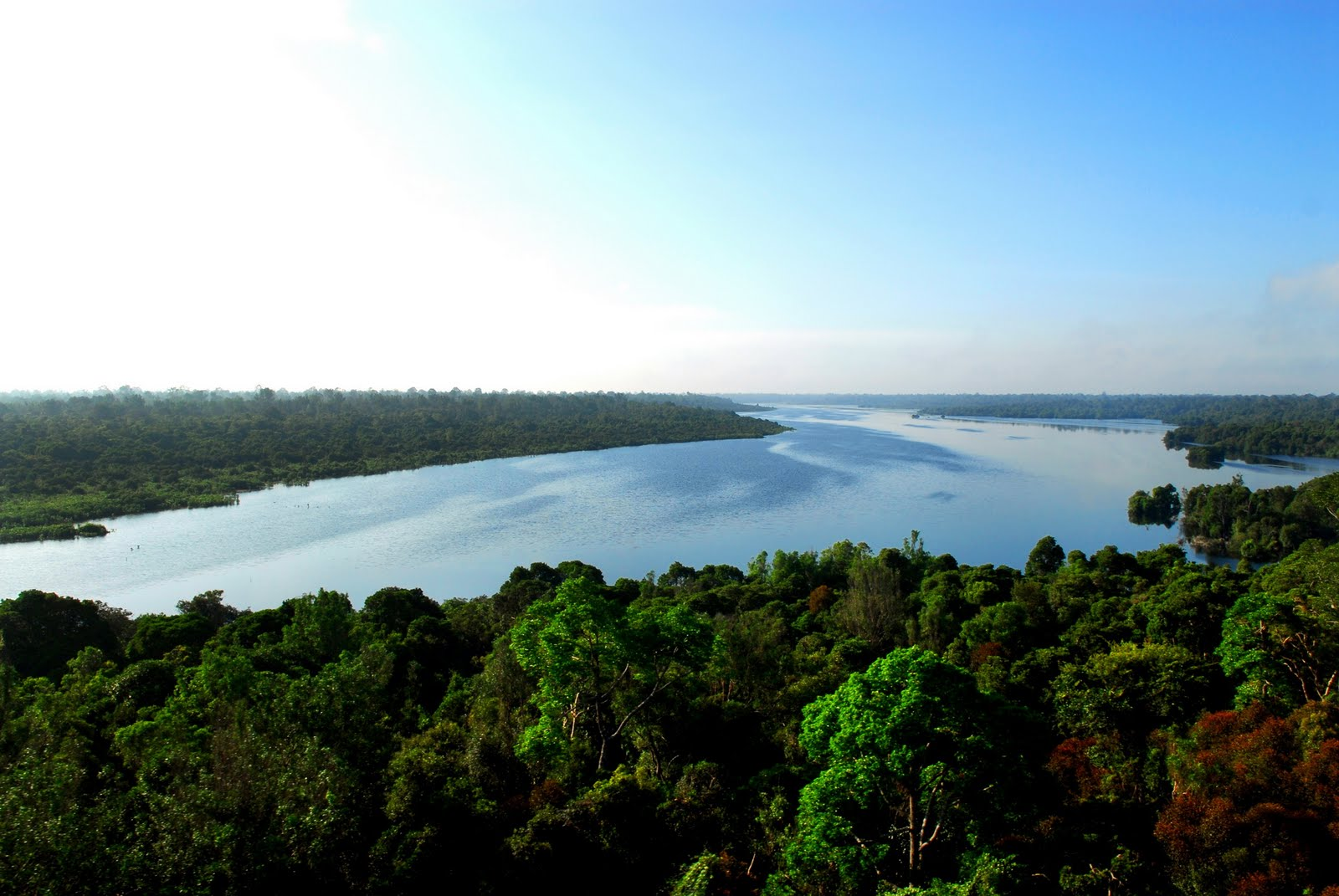

Giam Siak Kecil-Bukit Batu Bioreserve (Indonesian: Cagar Biosfer Giam Siak Kecil Bukit Batu or CB-GSK-BB) is a peatland area in Riau Province of Sumatra, covering 705,271 hectares (2,723.07 sq mi) and large parts of Bengkalis Regency and Siak Regency. It is a declared UNESCO Man and the Biosphere Reserve and supports a sustainable timber industry. It is home to two wildlife reserves, namely Giam Siak Wildlife Reserve and Bukit Batu Wildlife Reserve; flagship species include the Sumatran elephant and Sumatran tiger.

== History ==
The bioreserve is located in a province that has seen widespread forest destruction. Extensive logging has led to a decline in forest cover from 78% in 1982 to 33% in 2005; further reduction, at an average rate of 160,000 hectares per annum, has resulted in 22% left as of 2009. Deforestation has left the region vulnerable to intensifying flooding and landslides and has supported the highest of Indonesia's provincial population growth rates due to migration. Cleared land for palm oil and paper has led to not only perennial haze over the province, but also in Kuala Lumpur in Malaysia. The UNESCO Man and the Biosphere Reserve was created in 2009.

== Flora and fauna ==
The reserve houses an estimated 189 species of plants, 29 of which are classified as endangered under CITES, Appendix 1 and 3. Peat swamp forest flora are dominant. Several species of animals found in the reserve are classified as endangered under CITES Appendix 1 including the Sumatran elephant (Elephas maximus) and Sumatran tiger (Panthera tigris sumatrae), two species of birds, and one fish. Other flagship species include the sun bear, clouded leopard, marbled cat, Malayan tapir, and hairy-nosed otter. 162 species of moth are an important "indicator" of forest condition.

== Forest fires ==
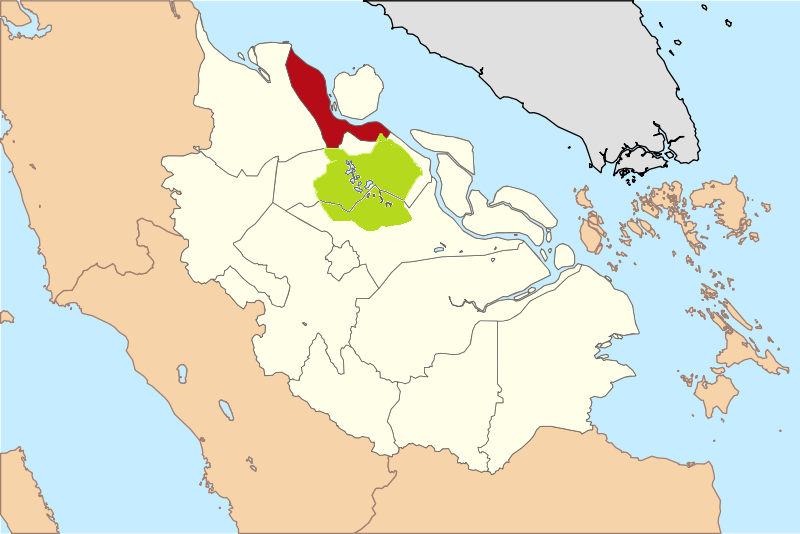
The green area approximates the area covered by the preserve, with the red area being Dumai city (kota), within Riau province. Pekan Baru, the capital and one of the fastest growing cities in the country, is located just south west of the preserve.

Haze due to forest burning and general land clearance is common. Despite establishment of the biosphere reserve in 2009, some 22% of the fires were still burning within it some months later. Again in February 2014, some 1,200 hectares of the reserve were burned.

CB-GSK-BB was initiated by private parties in cooperation with the government through BBKSDA (The Center for the Conservation of Natural Resources); major stakeholders include the Sinar Mas Group, a conglomerate which owns the largest paper and pulp company in Indonesia. The company marked Earth Day 2012, and the reserve has won accolades and acclaim from the press and United Nations, among other groups, yet issues of air quality in the surrounding area as well as in Kuala Lumpur in neighbouring Malaysia are unresolved.

== See also ==
- Deforestation in Indonesia
- The Burning Season (2008 film)
