= Syarif Kasim II =

Sultan of Siak Sri Indrapura

Yang Dipertuan Besar Syarif Kasim Abdul Jalil Saifuddin شريف قاسم عبدالجليل سيف الدين
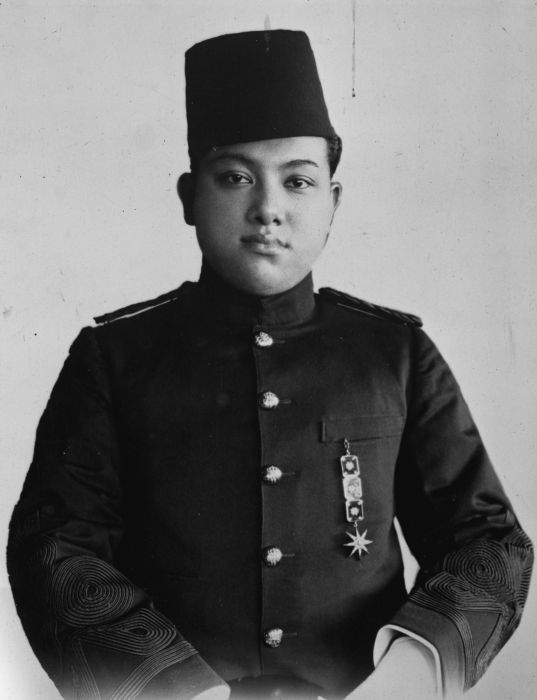
- Sultan Syarif Kasim II

12th Sultan of Siak Sri Indrapura Sultanate
- In office 1915–1946
- Preceded by: Sultan Syarif Hasyim
- Succeeded by: Monarchy abolished

Personal details
- Born: 1 December 1893 Siak Sri Indrapura (now Siak Regency, Indonesia)
- Died: 23 April 1968 (aged 74) Pekanbaru, Riau, Indonesia
- Spouse(s): Tengku Agung Syarifah Latifah (1912-1929); Tengku Syarifah Fadlun (1930-1950)

Yang Dipertuan Besar Syarif Kasim Abdul Jalil Saifuddin or Sultan Syarif Kasim II (Jawi: شريف قاسم عبدالجليل سيف الدين; 1 December 1893 – 23 April 1968) was the 12th and last sultan of the Sultanate of Siak Sri Indrapura. He was crowned as the sultan at the age of 23 succeeding his father Sultan Syarif Hasyim. Sultan Syarif Kasim II was a supporter of the independence struggle in Indonesia. After Indonesia proclaimed independence, he ceded Siak Sultanate to be part of united Indonesia, and he contributed his wealth of 13 million guilders (equivalent to 151 million guilders or €69 million in 2011). for a number of republican government causes. Together with the Sultan of Serdang, he also tried to persuade other kings of East Sumatra to join the republic cause.

Syarif Kasim was a Ba 'Alawi Sayyid and his lineage is recorded as follows: He is Kasim bin Hasyim, bin Kasim, bin Ismail, bin Ibrahim, bin Ali, bin Uthman, bin Abd al-Rahman, bin Saeed, bin Ali, bin Muhammad, bin Hasan, bin Umar, bin Hasan, bin Ali, bin Abu Bakr al-Sakran, bin Abd al-Rahman al-Saqqaf, bin Muhammad Mawla al-Dawilah, bin Ali Mawla al-Darak, bin Alawi al-Ghayur, bin Muhammad al-Faqih al-Muqaddam, bin Ali, bin Muhammad Sahib al-Mirbat, bin Ali Khali Qasam, bin Alawi al-Tsani, bin Muhammad Sahib al-Ṣawma'ah, bin Alawi al-Awwal, bin Ubaydullah, bin Ahmad al-Muhajir, bin Isa al-Rumi, bin Muhammad al-Naqib, bin Ali al-Urayḍi, bin Ja'far al-Sadiq, bin Muhammad al-Baqir, bin Ali Zayn al-Abidin, bin Husayn, bin Ali bin Abi Talib and Fatimah al-Zahra, the daughter of Muhammad.
