= Sultanate of Siak Sri Indrapura =

Sultanate that was located in the Siak Regency, Riau (1723–1949)

Sultanate of Siak Sri Indrapura Kesultanan Siak Sri Inderapura كسلطانن سياق سري ايندراڤورا
- 1722–1949
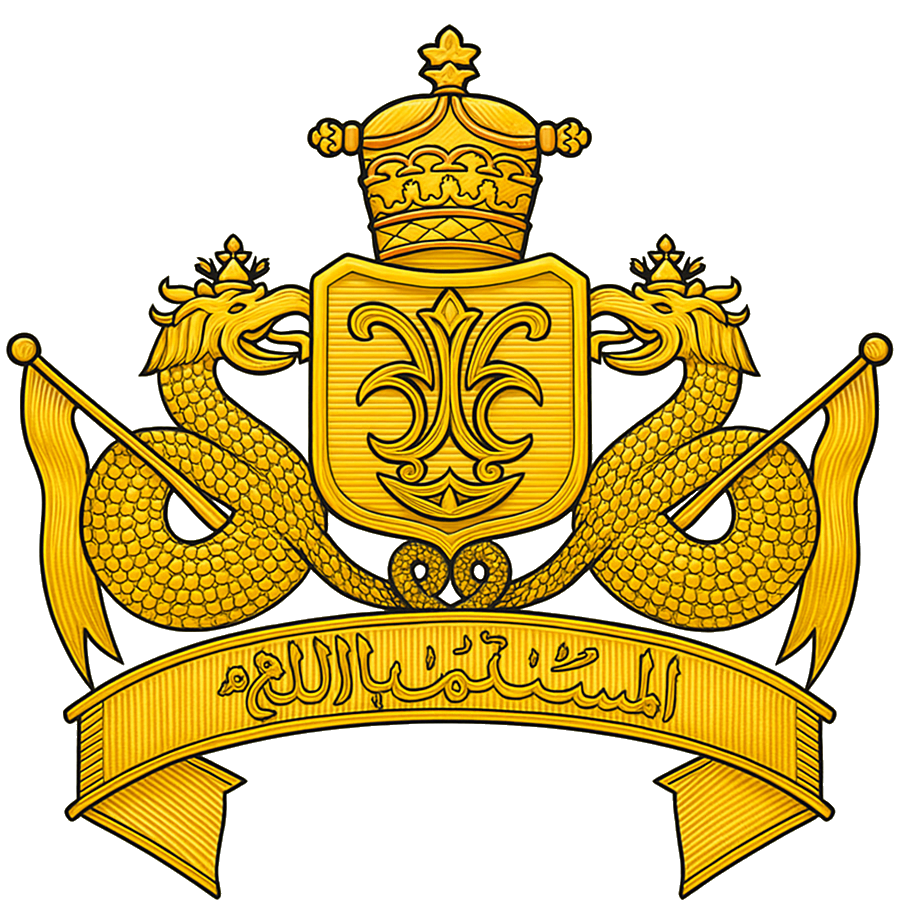
- Flag Coat of arms

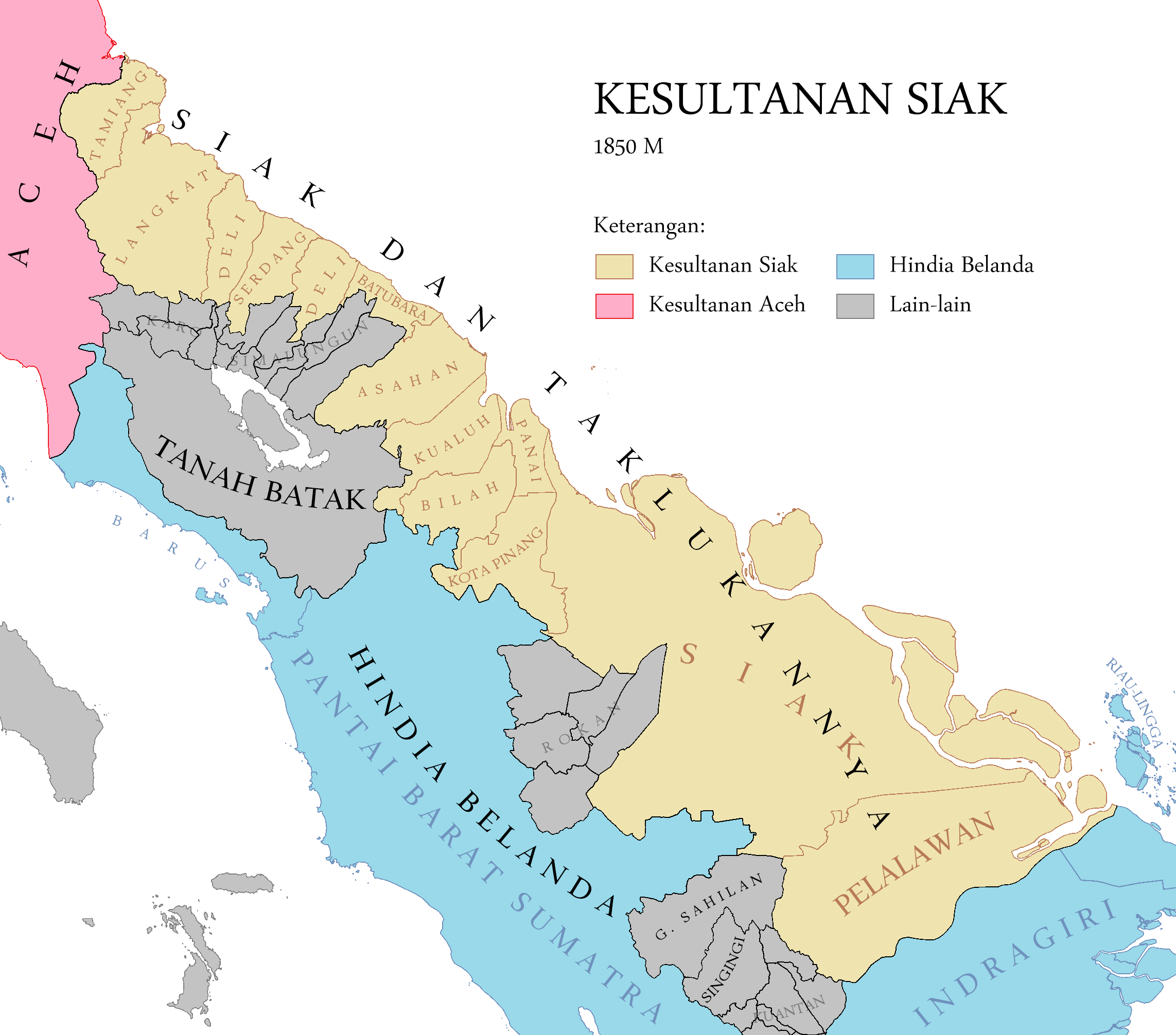
- Siak and its dependencies, 1850.
- Status: Part of the Dutch East Indies (1858-1946)
- Capital: Buantan, Mempura, Senapelan Pekanbaru, Siak Sri Indrapura
- Common languages: Malay
- Religion: Sunni Islam
- Sultan Yang Dipertuan Besar
  - 1722–1746: Abdul Jalil Rahmad Syah I
  - 1915–1949: Syarif Kasim II
- History
  - Founded: 1722
  - Joined Republic of Indonesia: 1949
Preceded by	Succeeded by
Johor Sultanate	Indonesia
- Today part of: Indonesia

The Sultanate of Siak Sri Indrapura, often called Sultanate of Siak (Indonesian: Kesultanan Siak Sri Inderapura; Jawi: كسلطانن سياق سري ايندراڤورا), was a kingdom that was located in present-day Siak Regency, and other nearby regions from 1722 to 1949. It was founded by Raja Kecil, who had close relations with the Johor Sultanate, after he failed to seize the Johor throne. The polity expanded in the 18th century to encompass much of eastern Sumatra as it brought various communities under its control through warfare and control of trade between the interior of Sumatra and the Malacca Strait. The Dutch colonial state signed a series of treaties with the Siak rulers in the 19th century, which reduced their area of state influence to the Siak River. For the remainder of the Dutch colonial era, it operated as an independent state with Dutch advisors. After Indonesia's Independence was proclaimed on 17 August 1945, the last sultan of Siak, Sultan Syarif Kasim II, ceded his kingdom to the Republic of Indonesia in 1946 and encouraged other sultans to do likewise.

== History ==
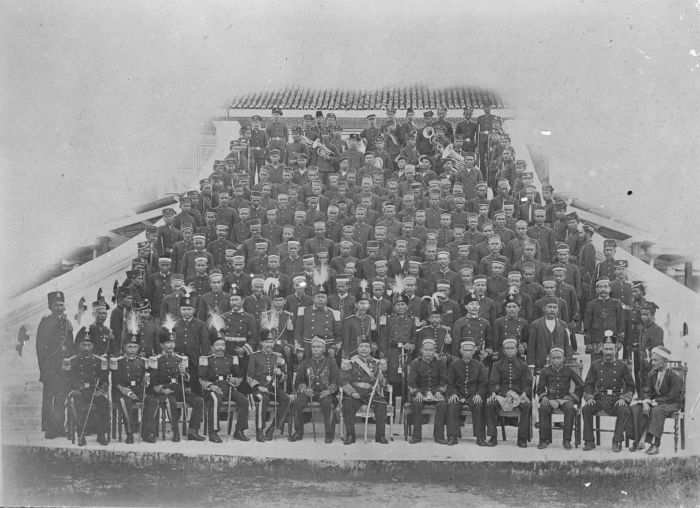
Group portrait of the Sultan of Siak and his retinue

The history of Riau before Indonesian independence is rooted in the history of Siak Sri Indrapura, a Malay Islamic kingdom. The Siak-centred sultanate was founded by Sultan Abdul Jalil Rahmat Shah in 1722. The first Sultan died in 1746 and later posthumously given the title of Marhum Buantan. The reign was continued to Sultan Abdul Jalil Muzaffar Shah (1746–1761) who ruled for about 19 years. This second Sultan succeeded in making the Kingdom of Siak Sri Indrapura strong and triumphant. The Dutch had a hand in placing him in power, however in 1759, a Dutch garrison in Siak was completely wiped out by orders from the same sultan. Later that same month, the Tuhfat al-Nafis reports a Dutch guardpost at Pulau Contong at the mouth of the Siak River being attacked by the sultan along with a hundred armed men, killing 65 of the 72 men there.

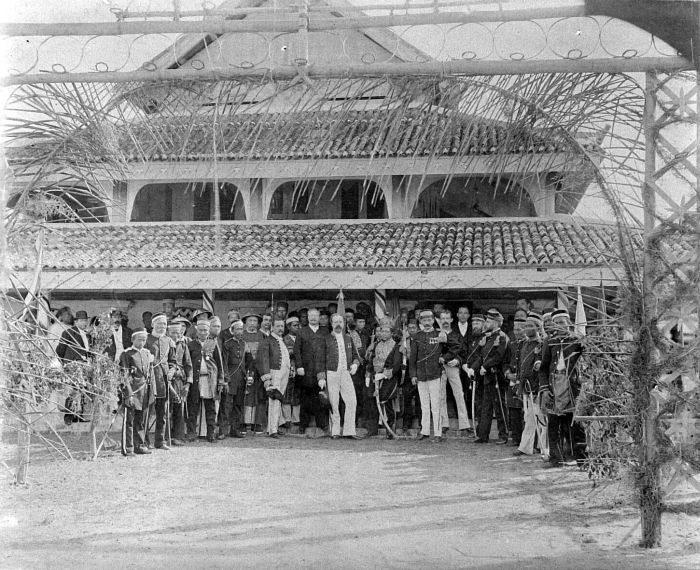
The inauguration of Hashim Abdul Jalil Muzaffar Shah as Sultan of Siak in 1889 in the presence of Resident of North Sumatra W.J.M. Michielsen, chief police Van der Pol and assistant resident Schouten.

The third Sultan was Abdul Jalil Jalaluddin Shah (1765–1766) had only ruled for a year. His real name was Tengku Ismail. His reign was under attacks of the Dutch East India Company (VOC) which took advantage of Tengku Alam (later became the fourth Sultan) as a shield. Sultan Abdul Jalil later dubbed Marhum Mangkat di Balai. Tengku Alam (1766–1780) ascended to the throne after the death of Abdul Jalil Jalaluddin, with the title of Sultan Abdul Jalil Alamuddin Syah and posthumously given the title of Marhum Bukit.

The daughter of fourth sultan, Abdul Jalil Alamuddin Syah, Badriyyah was married to Sayyid Uthman. He was a son of Sayyid Ibrahim Panjang Hidung, who was the husband of Siti Hitam, the daughter of Sayid Abdul Majid, a descendant of Ba'alawi. Uthman was then appointed as a military commander and religious advisor in the Sultanate. He was the father of Sayyid Ali, who would eventually claim the Siak throne. Almost all the Sultans of Siak from lineage of Sayyid Ali adopted the title "Syaifuddin" to signify their Arab ancestry.

The fifth enthroned sultan was Sultan Muhammad Ali Abdul Jalil Muazzam Shah (1780–1782). During his reign the Sultanate of Siak relocated to Senapelan (now Pekanbaru). He was also the founder of the city of Pekanbaru, so since his death in 1782 he has been styled Marhum Pekan. Sultan Yahya Abdul Jalil Muzaffar Shah later took the position as the sixth sultan during 1782–1784. Like the previous sultan, Sultan Yahya also only had 2 years to rule. He died in 1784 and was posthumously granted the title Marhum Mangkat di Dungun.

The seventh sultan, Ali Abdul Jalil Syaifuddin Ba'alawi, was the first sultan of Arab descent and holds the title al-Sayyid Sharif. During his reign the Kingdom of Siak reached its peak. He died in 1810 and was posthumously granted the title Marhum Kota Tinggi.

Ibrahim Abdul Jalil Khaliluddin was the eight sultan in the kingdom in 1810–1815, where his real name was Ibrahim. He died in 1815 and then was named the Marhum Mempura Kecil. He was then followed by Sultan Syarif Ismail Abdul Jalil Jalaluddin Ismail who took the reign during 1815–1854 which was given title Marhum Indrapura.

He was then followed by the next sultan, Qasim Abdul Jalil Syaifuddin I (Sharif Qasim I, ruled in 1864 to 1889). He died in 1889 and was posthumously granted the title Marhum Mahkota. His son, Syarif Hashim Abdul Jalil Muzaffar Shah was then raised to the throne during period 1889–1908. During his rule, many buildings were constructed which now have become the evidence of the Kingdom of Siak. He died in 1908 and was posthumously granted the title Marhum Baginda.

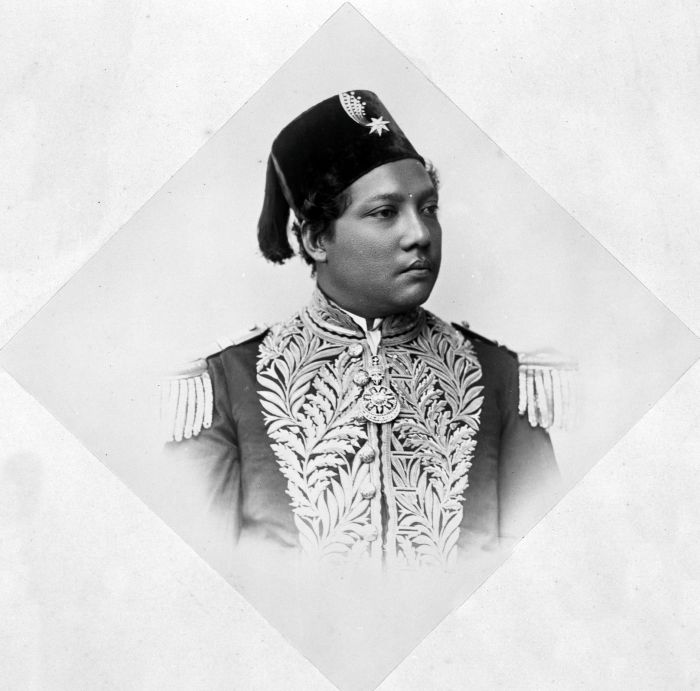
A Sultan of Siak, circa 1900

Post Anglo-Dutch Treaties of 1870–71, the colonial government created the Siak Residency in 1873, which covered the entire northeast coast of Sumatra to the sultanate of Deli. The transfer of the capital of the Oostkust van Sumatra residentie (Residency of East Coast Sumatra) in 1887 from Siak to Medan, the capital of Deli, confirms the decreased importance of the sultanate to the Dutch.

The last Sultan of Siak was Syarif Qasim Abdul Jalil Syaifuddin (Syarif Kasim II, reigned 1915–1949). The sultan with real name Tengku Sulong went to the throne seven years after the death of his father Sultan Hashim. In November 1945, Sultan Syarif Qasim II sent a cable to President of the Republic of Indonesia declaring allegiance to the newly created Government of the Republic of Indonesia. Not only that, the Sultan also handed over his property for the struggle of independence of the Republic of Indonesia.

== Siak Palace ==
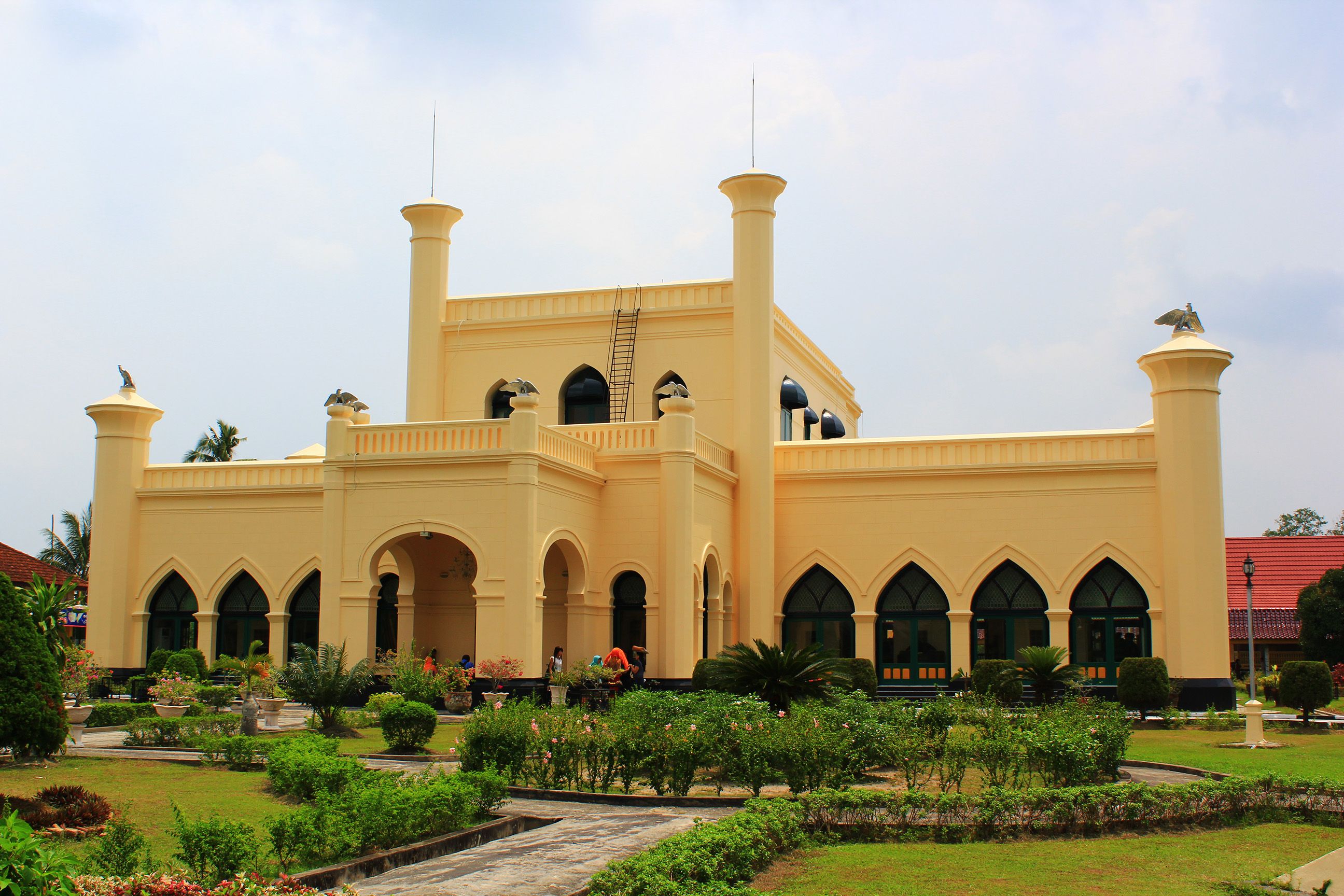
The Palace of Siak Sultanate

In 1889, the 11th sultan, Syarif Hasyim Abdul Jalil Syarifuddin built a Moorish-style palace 120 kilometres (75 mi) upstream of the Siak river in Pekanbaru. The palace is now a museum.

Before its construction, the sultan made a tour of Europe, visiting the Netherlands and Germany. In the architecture of the palace there are European influences that blend harmoniously with the Malay and Moorish elements, with the furniture was even brought from Europe.

The palace contains royal ceremonial objects, such as a gold-plated crown set with diamonds, a golden throne and personal objects of Sultan Syarif Qasyim and his wife, such as the "Komet", a multi-centennial musical instrument which is said to have been made only two copies in the world. Komet still works, and is used to play works by composers such as Beethoven, Mozart and Strauss.

The foundation of the palace of Siak has its share of myth. It is said that while the Sultan and his dignitaries were discussing the project, suddenly appeared a white dragon on the surface of the river Siak. The presence of the dragon was interpreted as a sign of blessing of the project and auspicious for the greatness of the kingdom. To immortalize the dragon, the Sultan made it the official emblem of the kingdom. The pillars of the palace were decorated with ornaments in the form of dragons.

In addition to the palace, the sultan also built a courtroom, the "Balairung Sari" (the flower room).

To the right of the main gate of the Syahabuddin mosque is the royal family cemetery, with its decoration of Muslim art.

== List of sultans of Siak ==
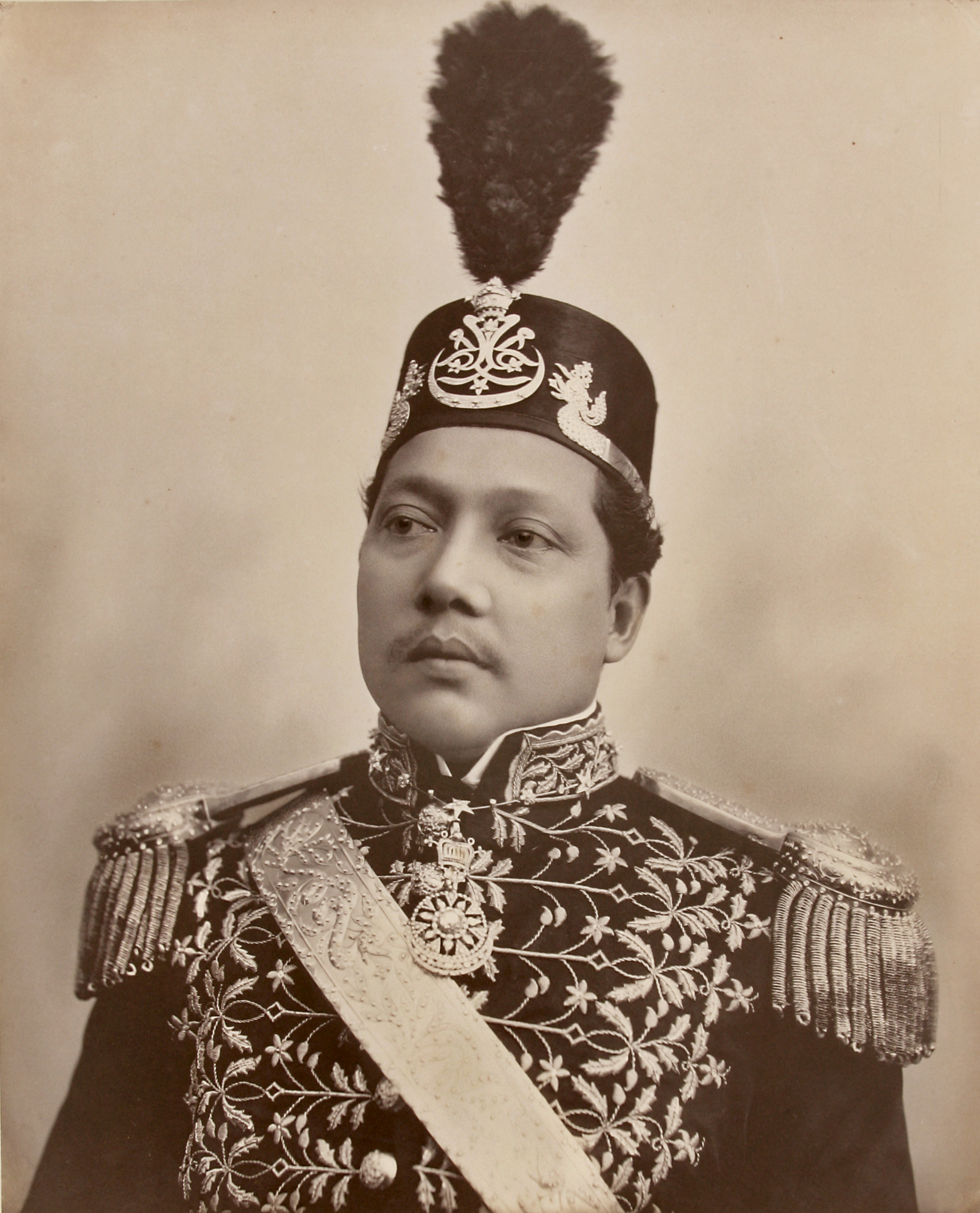
Sultan As-Sayyid Al-Sharif Hasyim Abdul Jalil Syaifuddin

1. Sultan Abdul Jalil Rahmat Shah (1722–1740)
2. Sultan Muhammad Abdul Jalil Jalaluddin Shah (1740–1760)
3. Sultan Ismail Abdul Jalil Jalaluddin Shah (1760–1761; 1779–1781)
4. Sultan Abdul Jalil Alamuddin Shah (1761–1765)
5. Sultan Muhammad Ali Abdul Jalil Muazzam Shah (1765–1779)
6. Sultan Yahya Abdul Jalil Muzaffar Shah (1781–1784)
7. Sultan As-Sayyid Al-Sharif Ali Abdul Jalil Syaifuddin (1784–1811)
8. Sultan As-Sayyid Al-Sharif Ibrahim Abdul Jalil Khaliluddin (1811–1827)
9. Sultan As-Sayyid Al-Sharif Ismail Abdul Jalil Syaifuddin (1827–1864)
10. Sultan As-Sayyid Al-Sharif Kassim Abdul Jalil Syaifuddin I (Syarif Kassim I), (1864–1889)
11. Sultan As-Sayyid Al-Sharif Hasyim Abdul Jalil Syaifuddin (1889–1908)
12. Pemangku Sultan As-Sayyid Al-Sharif Tengku Besar Syed Sagoff ibni Yang di-Pertuan Muda Tengku Sulong Muda Syed Alwee (1908-1915)
13. Sultan As-Sayyid Al-Sharif Kassim Abdul Jalil Syaifuddin II (Syarif Kassim II), (1915–1949)

== Family tree ==
Family Tree of Siak Sultans

Abdul Jalil; Rahmat Syah^{(1)} r. 1722-1746
Muhammad; Abdul Jalil; Syah^{(2)} r. 1746-1760	Abdul Jalil; Alamuddin; Syah^{(4)} r. 1761-1766
Ismail; Abdul Jalil; Syah^{(3)} r. 1760-1766, 1779-1781	Muhammad Ali; Abdul Jalil; Muazzam Syah^{(5)} r. 1766-1779	♀ Tengku; Embung	Sayyid Osman
Yahya; Abdul Jalil; Muzaffar Syah^{(6)} r. 1781-1791	Ali; Abdul Jalil; Saifuddin^{(7)} r. 1791-1811
Ibrahim; Abdul Jalil; Khaliluddin^{(8)} r. 1811-1827
Ismail; Abdul Jalil; Jaliluddin^{(9)} r. 1827-1864	Kasim; Abdul Jalil; Saifuddin I^{(10)} r. 1864-1889
Hasyim; Abdul Jalil; Saifuddin^{(11)} r. 1889-1908
Kasim; Abdul Jalil; Saifuddin II^{(12)} r. 1915-1946

== Coat of Arms ==
The official symbol of the Siak Sultanate involved a motif of two fighting dragons and Arabic script of the words "Allah" and the calligraphy of Muhammad Bertangkup.

== See also ==
- Pagaruyung Kingdom
- Riau-Lingga Sultanate
- Sultanate of Deli
- Sultanate of Serdang
