= Siak Sri Indrapura =

Coordinates: 0°47′44″N 102°03′07″E

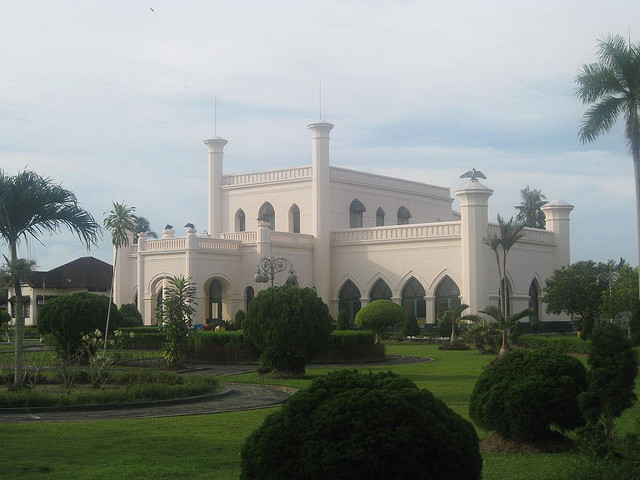
Castle of the Sultanate of Siak Sri Indrapura, Riau, Indonesia

Siak Sri Indrapura (Jawi: سياق سري ايندراڤورا ) is a town in Riau province of Indonesia and it is the capital (seat) of Siak Regency. It was the capital of the Sultanate of Siak Sri Indrapura.

== Climate ==
Siak Sri Indrapura has a tropical rainforest climate (Af) with heavy rainfall year-round.

Climate data for Siak Sri Indrapura
| Month | Jan | Feb | Mar | Apr | May | Jun | Jul | Aug | Sep | Oct | Nov | Dec | Year |
|---|---|---|---|---|---|---|---|---|---|---|---|---|---|
| Mean daily maximum °C (°F) | 30.9 (87.6) | 31.5 (88.7) | 32.1 (89.8) | 32.2 (90.0) | 32.4 (90.3) | 32.0 (89.6) | 31.8 (89.2) | 31.6 (88.9) | 31.7 (89.1) | 31.9 (89.4) | 31.4 (88.5) | 31.1 (88.0) | 31.7 (89.1) |
| Daily mean °C (°F) | 26.3 (79.3) | 26.7 (80.1) | 27.2 (81.0) | 27.4 (81.3) | 27.5 (81.5) | 27.2 (81.0) | 26.9 (80.4) | 26.8 (80.2) | 26.9 (80.4) | 27.1 (80.8) | 26.8 (80.2) | 26.5 (79.7) | 26.9 (80.5) |
| Mean daily minimum °C (°F) | 21.8 (71.2) | 22.0 (71.6) | 22.4 (72.3) | 22.7 (72.9) | 22.7 (72.9) | 22.4 (72.3) | 22.1 (71.8) | 22.1 (71.8) | 22.2 (72.0) | 22.3 (72.1) | 22.2 (72.0) | 22.0 (71.6) | 22.2 (72.0) |
| Average rainfall mm (inches) | 210 (8.3) | 157 (6.2) | 223 (8.8) | 228 (9.0) | 193 (7.6) | 120 (4.7) | 112 (4.4) | 156 (6.1) | 192 (7.6) | 275 (10.8) | 294 (11.6) | 230 (9.1) | 2,390 (94.2) |
Source: Climate-Data.org
