= Siak Regency =

Regency in Riau, Indonesia

Siak Regency Kabupaten Siak
- Regency
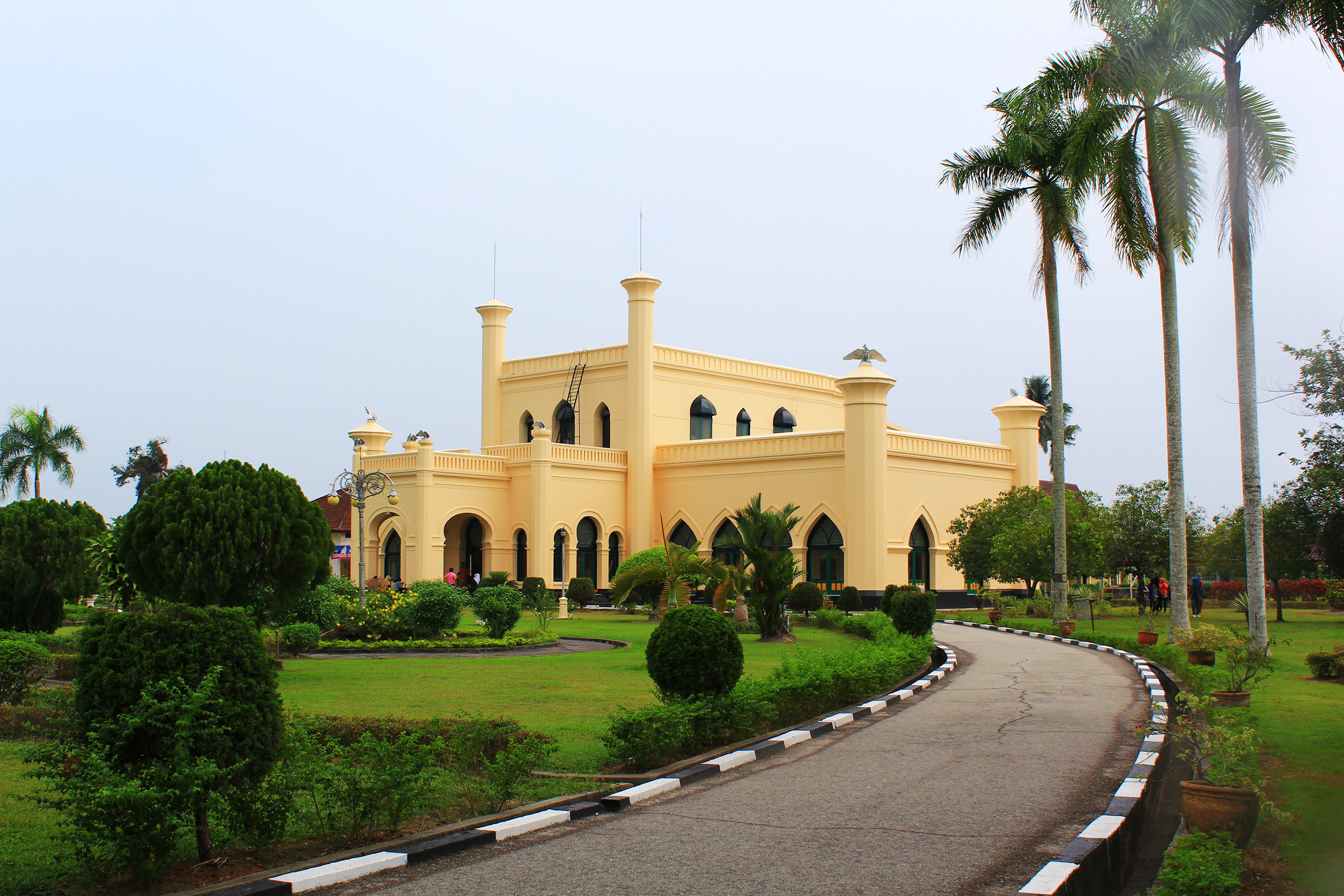
- Sultanate of Siak Palace

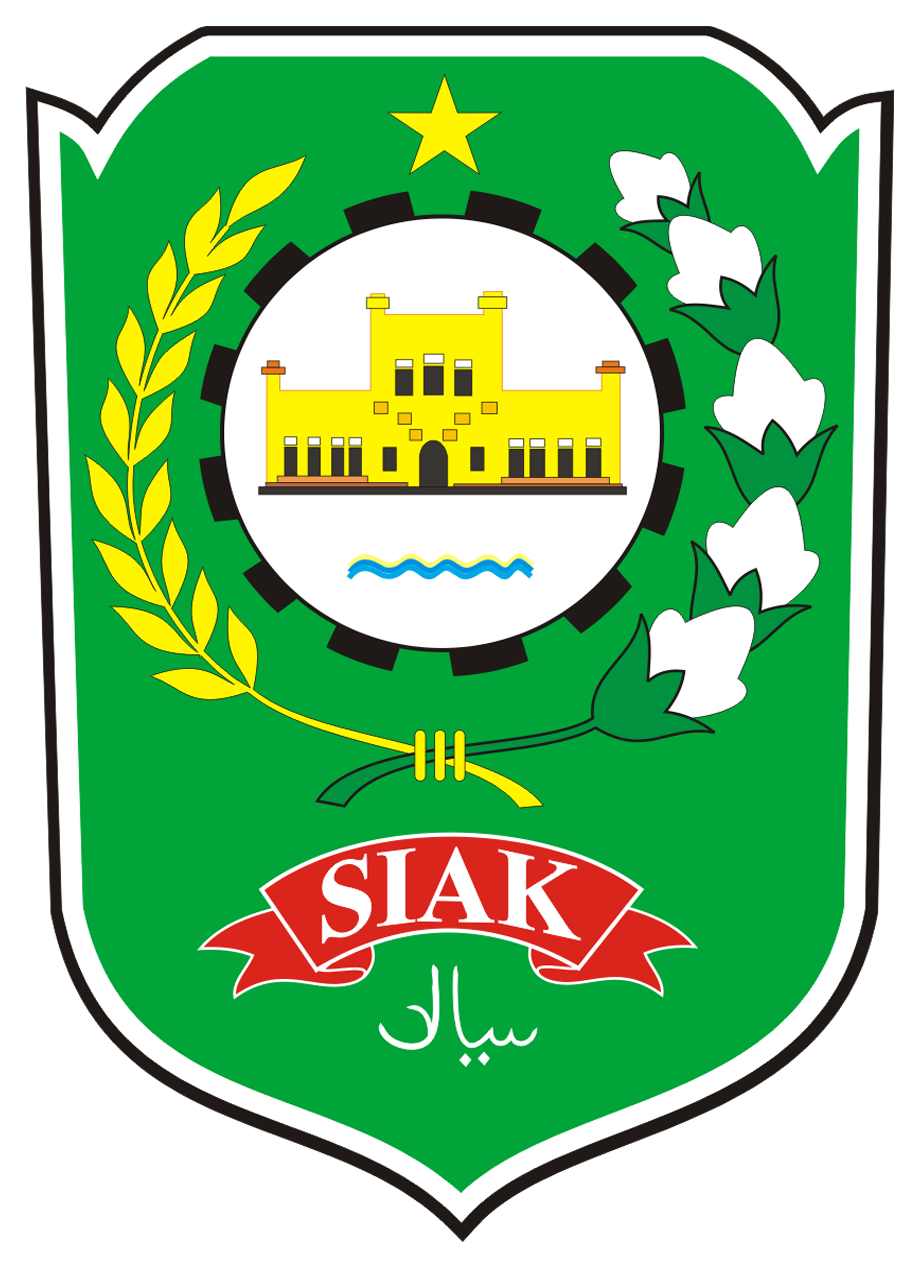
- Coat of arms

- Coordinates: 1°16′30″N 100°54′21″E
- Country: Indonesia
- Province: Riau
- Regency seat: Siak Sri Indrapura (Note: The regency office located in Mempura district)

Government
  - Regent: Alfedri
  - Vice Regent: Husni Merza

Area
  - Total: 7,803.57 km^{2} (3,012.98 sq mi)

Population (mid 2025 estimate)
  - Total: 507,729
  - Density: 65.0637/km^{2} (168.514/sq mi)
- Time zone: UTC+7 (WIB)
- Website: siakkab.go.id

Siak (Jawi: سياق) is a regency (kabupaten) of Riau Province, on the island of Sumatra, Indonesia. It has an area of 7,803.57 km^{2} and had a population of 376,742 at the 2010 Census and 457,940 at the 2020 Census; the official estimate as at mid 2025 was 507,729 (comprising 260,571 males and 247,158 females). The administrative centre of the regency is located at Siak Sri Indrapura in Mempura District . The northern part of this regency contains a large part of the Bukit Batu Biosphere Reserve.

Previously the area was part of the Sultanate of Siak Sri Indrapura. At the beginning of the independence of Indonesia, Sultan Syarif Kasim II, the Sultanate of Siak was the last state to join the Republic of Indonesia. Later this region was included in an area under the Siak Kewedanan Bengkalis. On 4 October 1999 under Law No. 53 of 1999, a Siak Regency was established from what had previously been the southern districts of Bengkalis Regency, and Siak Sri Indrapura was declared the administrative capital of Siak Regency.

== Administrative districts ==
Siak Regency is divided into fourteen administrative districts (kecamatan), listed below with their areas and their populations at the 2010 Census and the 2020 Census, together with the official estimates as at mid 2025. The table also includes the locations of the district administrative centres, the number of administrative villages in each district (a total of 122 rural desa and 9 urban kelurahan), and its post code.

Kode Wilayah	Name of District (kecamatan)	Area in km^{2}	Pop'n Census 2010	Pop'n Census 2020	Pop'n Estimate mid 2025	Admin centre	No. of villages	Post code
14.08.03	Minas	346.35	25,937	28,948	33,500	Minas Jaya	5 ^{(a)}	28695
14.08.05	Sungai Mandau	1,493.65	7,232	9,128	12,078	Muara Kelantan	9	28674
14.08.10	Kandis	894.17	57,762	74,727	82,754	Telaga Sam Sam	16 ^{(b)}	28686
14.08.01	Siak (district)	1,346.33	21,891	31,144	36,057	Kampung Dalam	8 ^{(c)}	28673
14.08.07	Kerinci Kanan	1,705.00	22,829	23,783	24,937	Kerinci Kanan	12	28654
14.08.04	Tualang	128.66	104,163	120,655	126,605	Perawang	9 ^{(d)}	28772
14.08.06	Dayun	155.09	26,545	30,959	35,334	Dayun	11	28671
14.08.11	Lubuk Dalam	343.60	16,961	19,905	21,846	Lubuk Dalam	7	28655
14.08.09	Koto Gasib	704.70	18,513	23,469	26,314	Pangkalan Pisang	11	28672
14.08.13	Mempura	232.24	14,119	16,951	18,880	Sungai Mempura	8 ^{(e)}	28773
14.08.02	Sungai Apit	151.00	25,012	30,997	34,236	Sungai Apit	15 ^{(f)}	28662
14.08.08	Bunga Raya	437.45	20,939	26,777	30,668	Bunga Raya	10	28764
14.08.12	Sabak Auh	73.38	9,798	12,911	14,436	Bandar Sungai	8	28684
14.08.14	Pusako	544.47	5,041	7,586	9,084	Dusun Pusaka	7	28765
	Totals	8,556.09^{(g)}	376,742	457,940	507,729	Siak Sri Indrapura	136	

Notes: (a) includes the kelurahan of Minas Jaya. (b) includes 3 kelurahan - Kandis Kota (with 14,087 inhabitants as at mid 2023), Simpang Belutu (with 9,036 inhabitants) and Telaga Sam Sam (with 8,958 inhabitants).
(c) includes 2 kelurahan - Kampung Dalam (with 8,074 inhabitants in mid 2023) and Kampung Rempak (with 8,772 inhabitants in mid 2023).
(d) includes the kelurahan of Perawang. In this district, Perawang kelurahan had 36,066 inhabitants as at mid 2023, while the neighbouring desa of Perawang Barat had 32,960 inhabitants and Tualang desa had 18,569 inhabitants.
(e) includes the kelurahan of Sungai Mempura (with 4,110 inhabitants as at mid 2023). (f) includes the kelurahan of Sungai Apit.
(g) since revised (in 2025) to 7,803.57 km^{2}, but no breakdown by district is yet available.

== Transportation ==
=== Water ===
From Pekanbaru, Siak can be reached by river from Pekanbaru's Port, There is usually a boat that operates every 4-5 times a week with a travel time of around 2–4 hours. In addition to Pekanbaru itself, this port also serves other destinations including Bengkalis, Selat Panjang, and Batam (via Buton Bengkalis).

=== Land ===
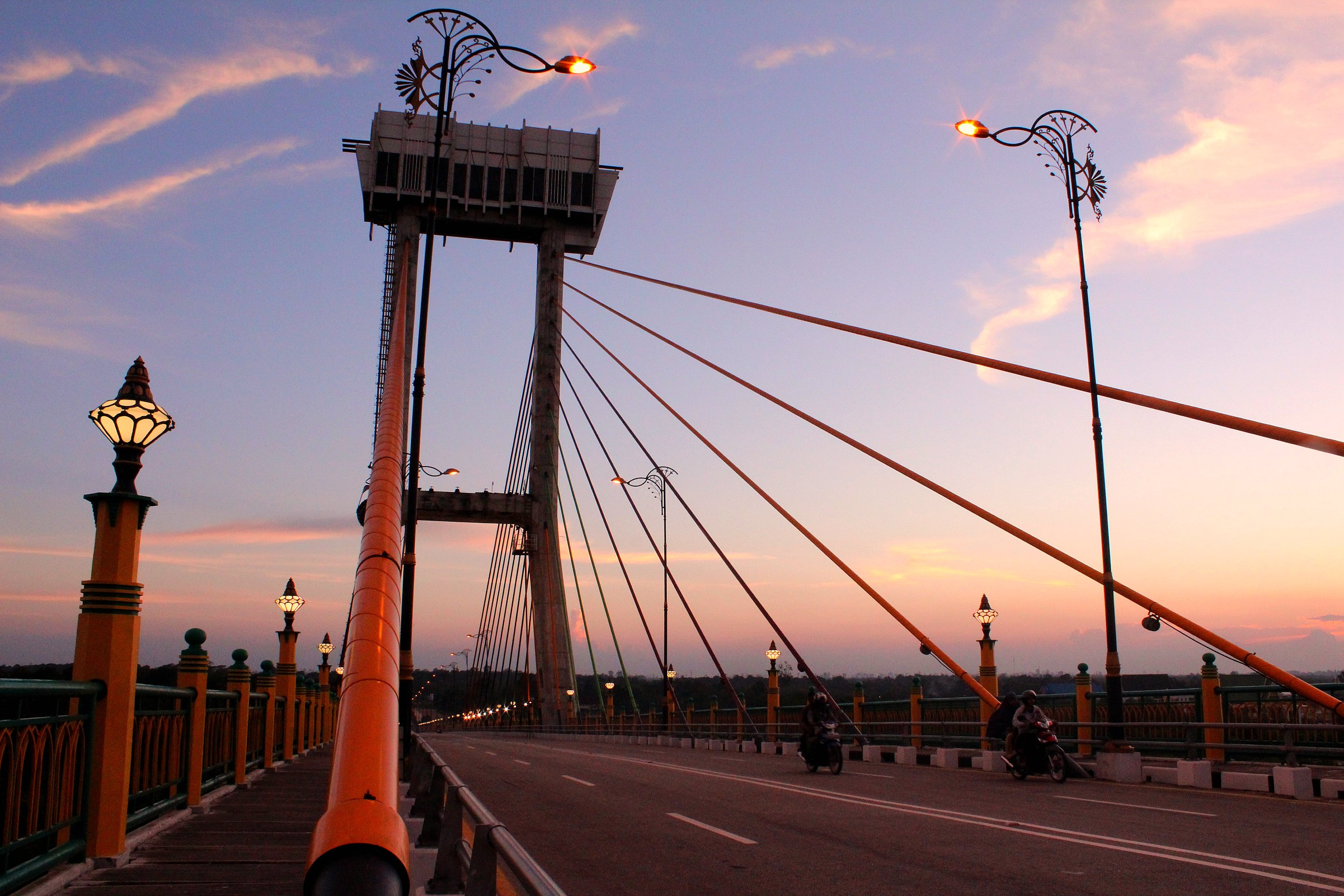
The Siak Sri Indrapura Bridge or Tengku Agung Sultanah Latifah Bridge was opened in 2007 and was the Grandest Bridge until 2009.

Other than by river, Siak can also be reached by road, From Pekanbaru which is about a 3 to 4 hour journey. In addition Siak has a bridge that connects Siak with its capital which is named Tengku Agung Sultana Latifah which is the name of a previous Sultan of Siak. This bridge was inaugurated on 11 August 2007 and was known as the longest bridge in Indonesia until 2010, until the construction of the Suramadu Bridge in Surabaya was finished.

== Tourism ==
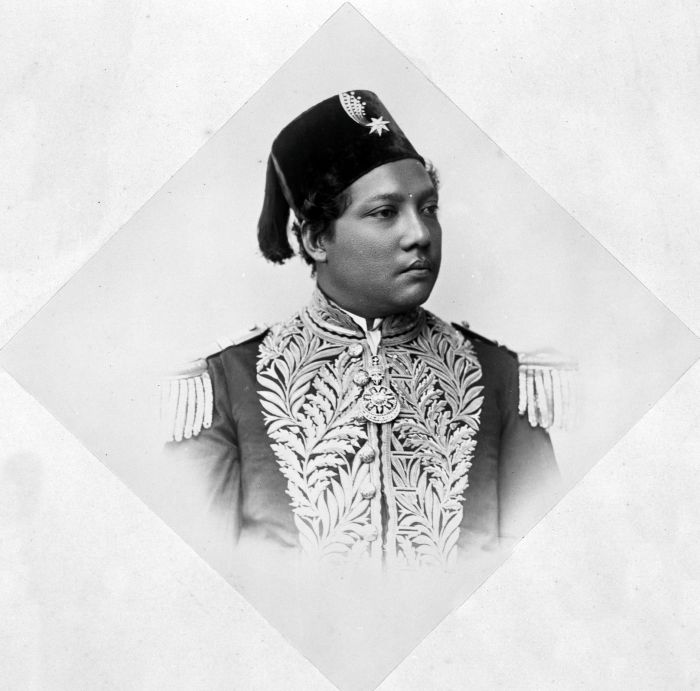
As-Sayyid Al-Sharif Hasyim Abdul Jalil Syaifuddin, Sultan of Siak (r.1889-1908), circa 1900

Tours of Siak include the Siak Sri Indrapura Palace, which is a historic palace of the Sultanate of Siak. The palace is very famous, many tourists visit to see the grandeur of the palace and the objects located within, such as the golden throne which belonged to the Sultan, the royal dining chairs and a Komet Music Box of which only one other remains in the world. This palace is open from 10 am to 4 pm.

== Borders ==
Heading	Border
North	Bengkalis Regency
South	Kampar Regency and Pelalawan Regency
West	Kampar Regency and Pekanbaru
East	Bengkalis Regency and Pelalawan Regency
