= Siak River =

River in Indonesia

Coordinates: 1°14′16″N 102°10′00″E

Siak Sungai Siak
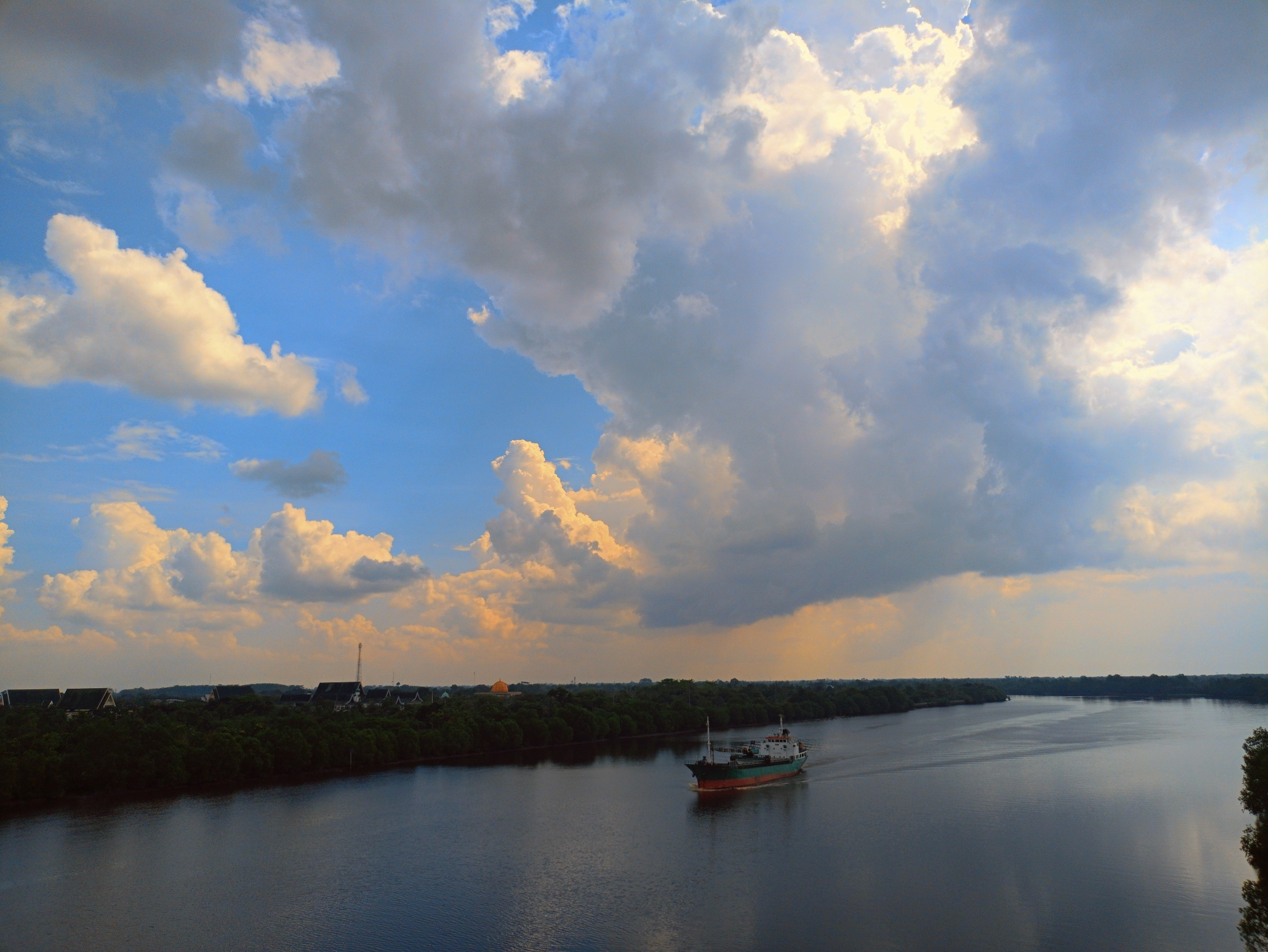
- The Siak River flowing through the town of Siak Sri Indrapura.

- Location of river mouth Siak River (Indonesia)

Location
- Country: Indonesia
- Province: Riau

Physical characteristics
- Source
  - elevation: 0 m (0 ft)
- Mouth: Malacca Strait
- Length: 370 km (230 mi)
- Basin size: 10,423 km^{2} (4,024 mi^{2})
- Discharge
  - location: Siak Delta, Malacca Strait
  - average: (Period of data: 2009–2013)720 m^{3}/s (25,000 cu ft/s)

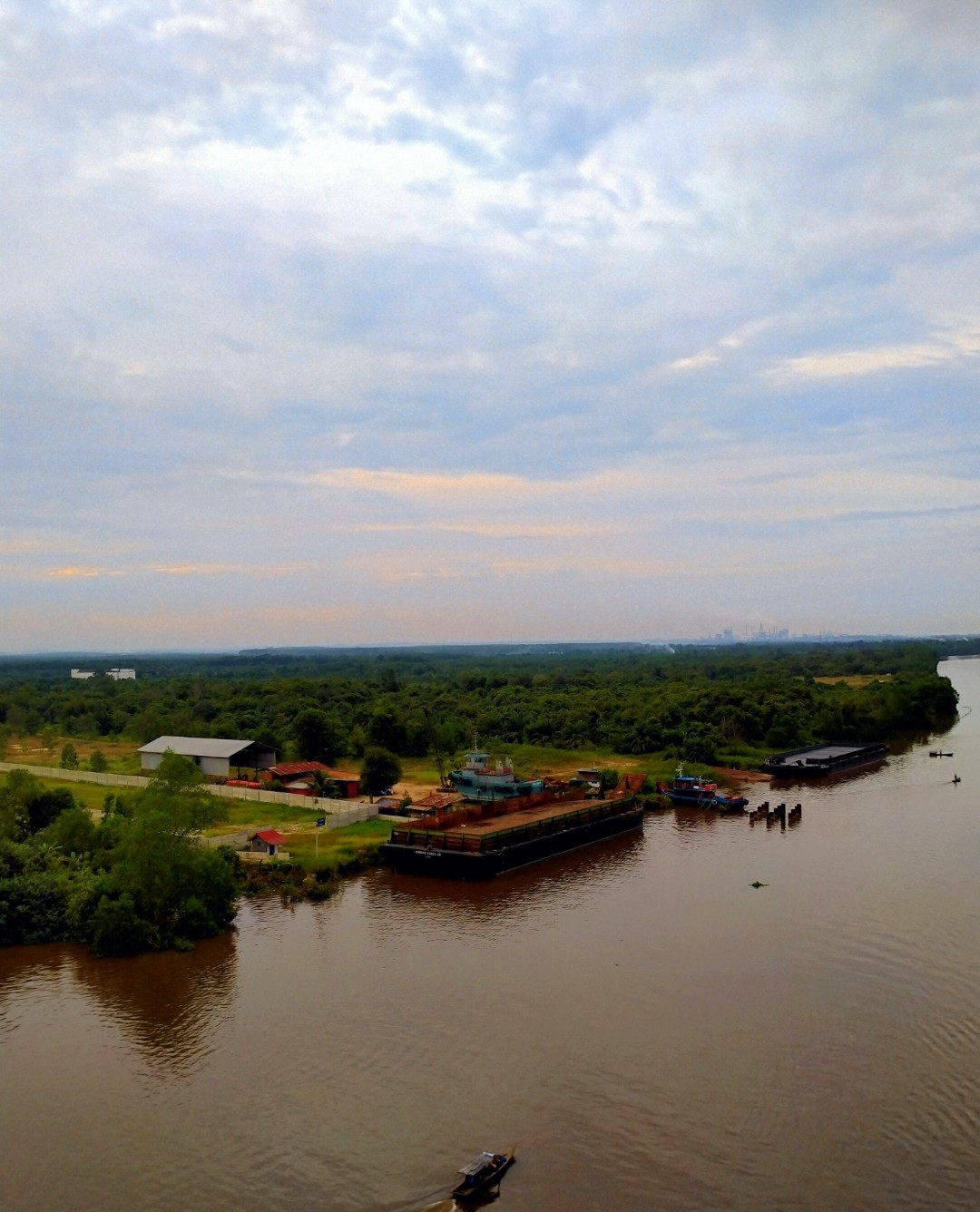
The Siak River flowing through the town of Perawang. Photo taken on the Maredan bridge.

The Siak is a major river of Riau province, in the east of Sumatra, Indonesia, about 1000 km northwest of the capital Jakarta. Approximately 370 kilometres in length, the Siak is a blackwater river which owes its brown color to dissolved organic matter (DOM) leached from surrounding, heavily disturbed peat soils; it is heavily polluted, notably by the petroleum industry. It flows through the city of Pekanbaru and other large towns such as Siak Sri Indrapura before emptying into the Strait of Malacca.

== Geography ==
The river flows through the central region of Sumatra with a predominantly tropical rainforest climate (designated as Af in the Köppen-Geiger climate classification). The annual average temperature in the area is 23 °C. The warmest month is October, when the average temperature is around 25 °C, and the coldest is January, at 22 °C. The average annual rainfall is 2673 mm. The wettest month is November, with an average of 418 mm rainfall, and the driest is January, with 106 mm rainfall.

== See also ==
- List of drainage basins of Indonesia
- List of rivers of Indonesia
- List of rivers of Sumatra
