= Hanseatic (disambiguation) =

The Hanseatic League was a trading alliance in northern Europe in existence between the 13th and 17th centuries.

Hanseatic may also refer to:

- Hanseatic (class), upper-class people of the free imperial cities Hamburg, Bremen and Lübeck since mid-17th century after the end of the Hanseatic league
- MS Hanseatic, a cruise ship operated by Hanseatic Tours 1993–1997 and by Hapag–Lloyd Cruises 1997 onwards
- SS Hanseatic (1930), an ocean liner operated by Hamburg Atlantic Line 1958–1966
- SS Hanseatic (1964), an ocean liner/cruise ship operated by German Atlantic Line 1967–1973
- SS Hanseatic (1969), a cruise ship operated by German Atlantic Line 1973

== See also ==
- Hanseatic Parliament, an association of business chambers around the Baltic Sea, founded in the early 1990s
- Hanseatic Tours, a German cruise line that operated 1991–1997
