= Tourism in Antarctica =

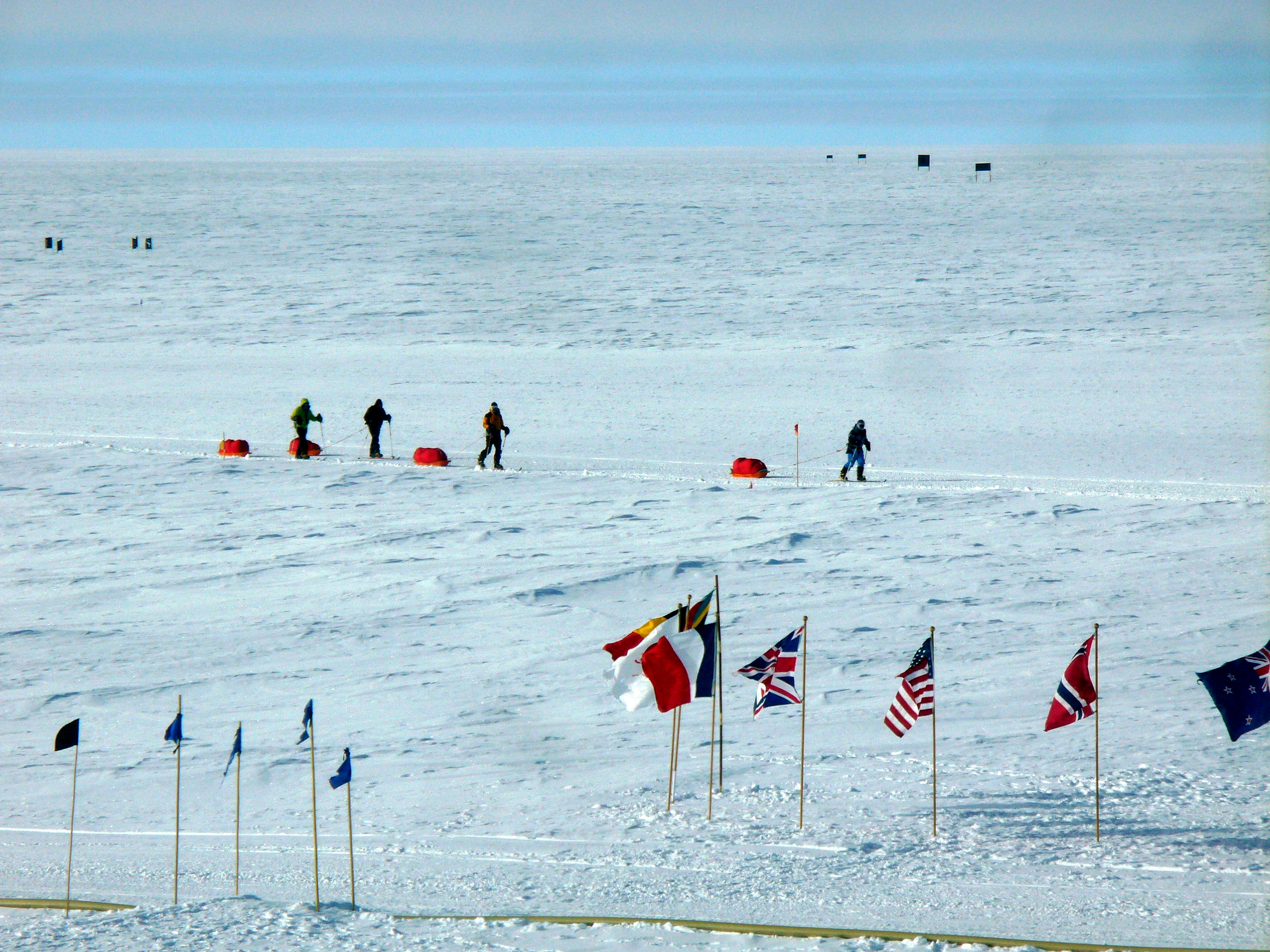
A party of skiers arrives after traversing overland to the South Pole, December 2009

Tourism started in Antarctica by the sea in the 1960s, following the 1959 treaty. Air overflights started in the 1970s with sightseeing flights by airliners from Australia and New Zealand, and were resumed in the 1990s. The (summer) tour season lasts from November to March.

== Visitor trends ==
Annual tourist numbers were around 8,000 in the mid 1990s, but visitor numbers have risen significantly beyond forecasts. A study in 2014 predicted that visitor numbers would reach 120,000 by 2060, but this number was reached in the 2023–24 season. As of 2025, tourist visits are highly concentrated around the Antarctic Peninsula, the destination for 98% of tourist vessels. Most of these leave from the port of Ushuaia in Argentina. Only a small percentage of tourists visit the Ross Sea region or parts of the interior of the continent.

An increasing number of visitors to Antarctica are engaging in mountaineering, skiing and skydiving (activities classified by the International Association of Antarctic Tourism Operators (IAATO) as deep-field experiences). The numbers involved in these deep-field experiences have doubled over a decade, reaching around 800 in the 2023–34 season.

By 2025, the number of cruise visitors travelling to Antarctica each year reached 124,000, mostly on vessels travelling to the Antarctic peninsula from South America. Researchers expressed concern about the potential impact, and in particular the risk of visitors emulating hazardous activities shared on social media. In 2025, a forecast of visitor numbers suggested that tourist numbers could reach 452,000 by the 2033–34 season.

== Landing in Antarctica ==
Tourism companies are required by the Antarctic Treaty to have a permit to visit Antarctica. Because no country owns Antarctica, countries which have signed the Antarctic Treaty issue permits, rather than visas. For example, an Australian traveling to Antarctica with a tourist company would need to show compliance with the Antarctic Treaty (Environment Protection) Act 1980 by means of an Environmental Impact Assessment (EIA) approved by the Australian Antarctic Division (AAD) of the Department of Agriculture, Water, and the Environment.

Many sea cruises by cruise ships include a landing by RIB (Zodiac) or helicopter. Some land visits may include mountaineering, skiing or even a visit to the South Pole.

== Sea cruises ==
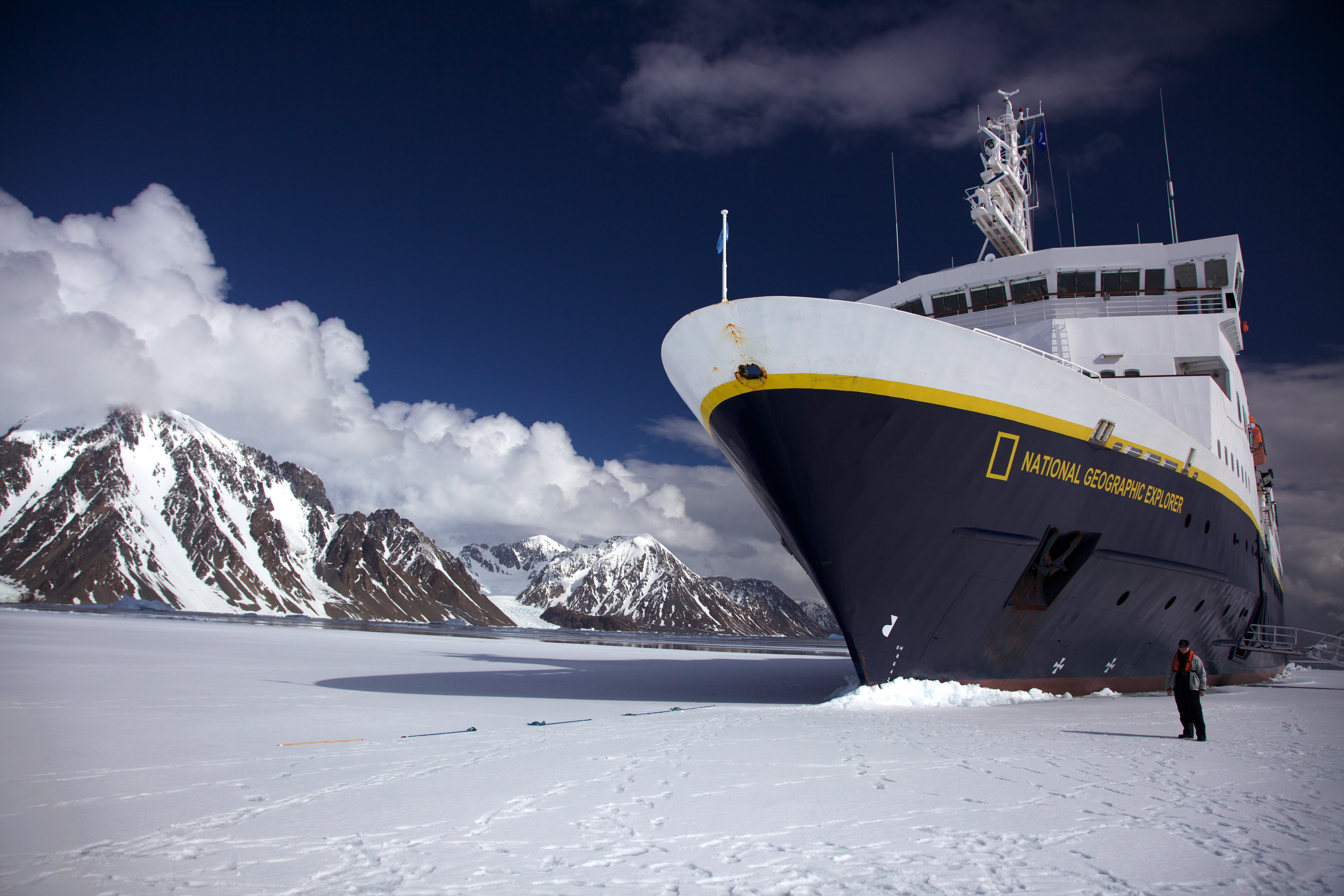
The expedition ship National Geographic Explorer

During the 1920s, a Falkland Islands mail ship, the SS Fleurus, made annual trips to the South Shetland Islands and South Orkney Islands to serve whaling and sealing stations there. It carried a small number of commercial passengers, and marketed round-trip "tourist tickets"; these were probably the first commercial tourists to sail to Antarctica.

Modern expedition cruising was pioneered by Lars-Eric Lindblad; in 1969, he launched the MS Lindblad Explorer, a purpose-built liner. Many of the sea cruises leave from Ushuaia in Argentina. Sea cruises generally last anywhere between 10 days and 3 weeks and costs start from around US$6,000 per person for shared accommodation cabins.

There are limited sea cruises to the Ross Sea and East Antarctic (Commonwealth Bay) regions of Antarctica. The New Zealand expedition travel company Heritage Expeditions operates cruises to these regions several times a year in the ice-strengthened vessel Heritage Adventurer.

== Scenic flights ==
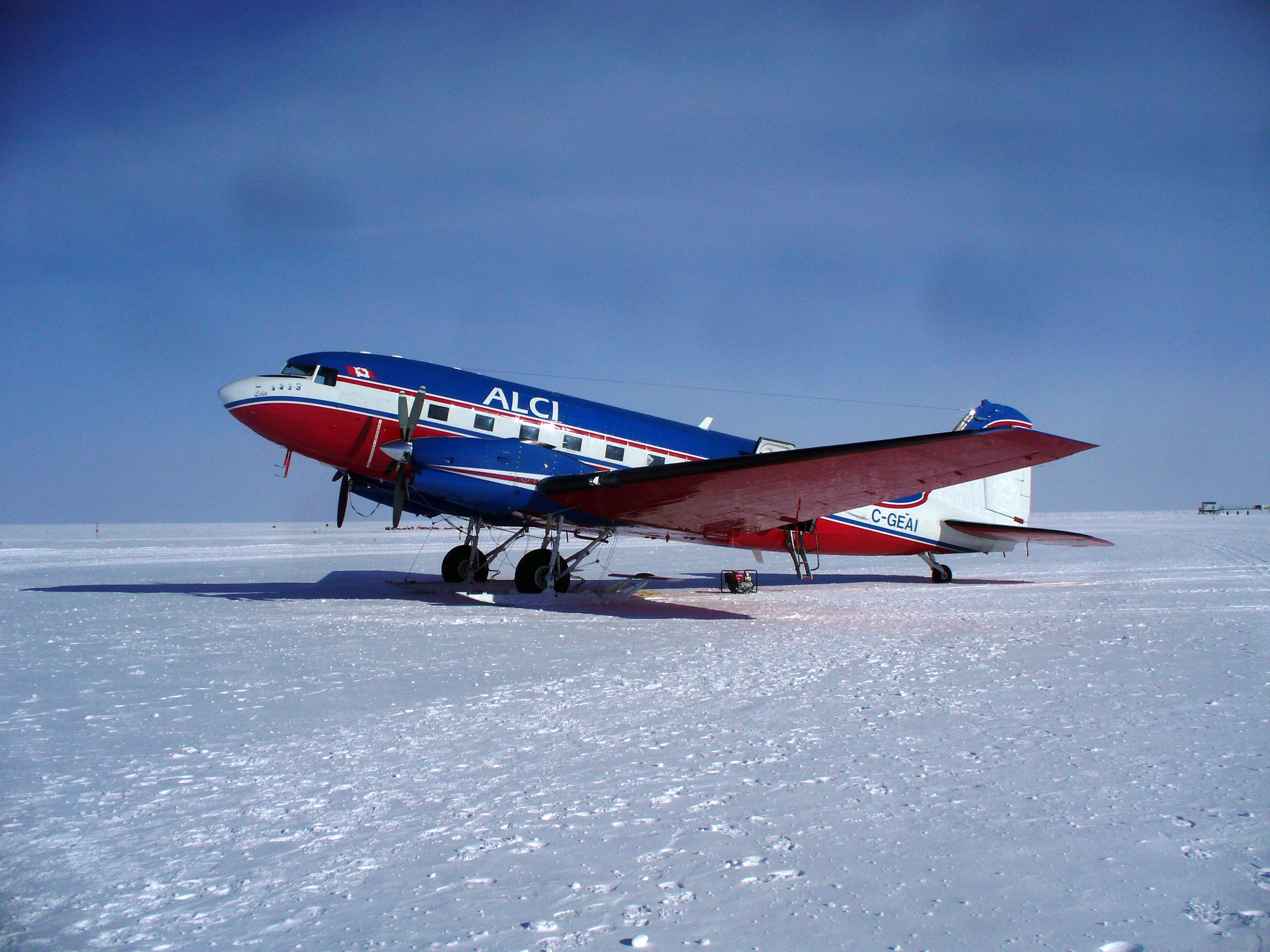
A Basler BT-67 owned by Antarctic Logistics Centre International and used for tourist flights in Antarctica, at the South Pole in December 2009

Most scenic flights to Antarctica have been organized from Australia and New Zealand, with airlines from both countries commencing flights in February 1977. The majority of the flights are simple return trips, and in no cases have they landed in Antarctica.

Air New Zealand's first scenic flight took place on 15 February 1977 and was followed by five more that year, then four each in 1978 and 1979. The flights were operated with McDonnell-Douglas DC-10s and departed from Auckland, flying over Ross Island to McMurdo Sound before returning to Auckland with a fuel stop in Christchurch. Later flights flew down the middle of the Sound and over Scott Base rather than over Ross Island as the aircraft could descend to a low altitude to provide better visibility for passengers (Note: The low pass could not, however, be conducted at low speed as doing so would require the deployment of the aircraft's flaps, and had these become locked in their deployed positions the aircraft would not have sufficient fuel to return to an airport.). Many flights carried experienced Antarctic researchers as guides, including on at least one occasion Sir Edmund Hillary, and lasted roughly 12 hours with approximately four of them over or near the Antarctic mainland. On 28 November 1979, a route planning error led to Air New Zealand flight TE901 crashing into Mount Erebus with the loss of all 257 lives aboard. (Note: Air New Zealand used two IATA airline designators from its establishment in 1978 until 1990, with NZ being used on flights within New Zealand and TE on international services as well Antarctic flights, even though they were considered domestic for purposes of customs and immigration.) Air New Zealand cancelled and never resumed their Antarctic flying programme in the aftermath of the TE901 disaster.

Qantas operated its first Antarctic flight on 13 February 1977, a charter organized by Sydney entrepreneur Dick Smith. By 1979 twenty-seven flights had carried more than 7,000 passengers. Most used Boeing 747-200Bs and flew from Sydney, Melbourne, or Perth on one of two "ice" routes. One went along the coast of George V Land to the French base in Adélie Land, then back over the south magnetic pole. The other went over Oates Land and northern Victoria Land to Cape Washington in the Ross Dependency. In 1977, one flight duplicated Air New Zealand's routing and overflew McMurdo Sound and Mount Erebus. Some shorter flights from Melbourne were also operated by Boeing 707s. Qantas also cancelled its Antarctic programme after the TE901 disaster but eventually resumed it in 1994, and continues to operate charter flights in summer from Sydney, Perth and Melbourne to this day with Boeing 747-400s.

In 2020, Qantas resumed its sightseeing flights program, which is currently operational. Flights last 12 hours and cost between $1000 and $8000.

Qantas also now flies in summer from Brisbane and other Australian capitals through Antarctica Flights. The Brisbane flights last 14 hours and 30 minutes in a Boeing 787 Dreamliner.

There have also been earlier scenic overflights, including some from Chile in 1958.

== Yachting ==
There were private yacht voyages in the Southern Ocean from the late 1960s, with some circumnavigations of Antarctica e.g. by David Henry Lewis in 1972.

There are now about 30 yachts each year visiting the Antarctic Peninsula, which is in a banana belt (warmer region of the continent). Many four-day cruises leave from Tierra del Fuego in Argentina, others from Ushuaia or Stanley.

Only smaller vessels are allowed to bring their crew ashore.

== Land activities ==
Land activities include camping, hiking and cross country skiing. These activities have become especially popular in recent times, as suggested by the increased number of tourists that come to visit Antarctica.

== Environmental impacts ==
The annual peak in tourist visits to Antarctic occurs during the Southern Hemisphere summer, mostly between November and March. This timeframe suits tourist vessels because reduced sea ice enables closer access to land. However, this same period is also peak breeding season for many species that breed on land, creating the potential for adverse effects from tourist activity. Land-based activities can lead to disturbance to macrofauna, soil degradation, damage to vegetation, litter and the introduced of non-native species. Ship-based activities can cause pollution from emissions, leaks, and marine debris, and disturbance or injury to marine mammals. Airborne tourism activities can produce emissions and cause noise disturbance to fauna. However, there has been little research on the cumulative effects of tourism in Antarctica. The International Association of Antarctica Tour Operators in association with the Scientific Committee on Antarctic Research initiated a collaborative project in 2018–19 that aims to develop a systematic conservation plan (SCP) focussed on the Antarctic Peninsula.

Recent academic research has identified decarbonisation of cruise and aviation operations as a growing priority for Antarctic tourism governance, reflecting concerns about emissions associated with increasing visitor numbers.

== Regulations ==
In terms of safety, IMO's International Code for Ships Operating in Polar Waters (Polar Code) requires that ships operating in the Antarctic must have a Polar Ship Certificate.

Tourist operators in Antarctica are mostly members of an association the International Association of Antarctica Tour Operators (IAATO) that was formed to promote safety and environmental responsibility amongst cruise operators. The members of this association carry the majority of tourists to Antarctica, and the organization releases statistics yearly on tourism. IAATO provides a form of self-regulation of cruise operators through the publication of operating standards, that cover emergency preparedness, scheduling and co-ordination of ship visits, minimum ratios of guides (currently no more than 20 visitors for each guide), a limit of 100 persons ashore at any one time, and a prohibition of landing for any vessel carrying 500 or more fare-paying passengers.

As of May 2026, a current concern of IAATO is the spread of avian flu.

The Environmental Protocol to the Antarctic Treaty does not specifically address tourism, but its provisions go some way to minimizing the adverse impacts of tourists because, once ratified, the protocol is legally binding over all visitors to the Antarctic, whether on government or private trips.

In 1994 the Treaty countries made further recommendations on tourism and non-government activities. This "Guidance for Visitors to the Antarctic" is intended to help visitors become aware of their responsibilities under the treaty and protocol. The document concerns the protection of Antarctic wildlife and protected areas, the respecting of scientific research, personal safety and impact on the environment. Guidelines have also been written for the organizers of tourist and private ventures – these require prior notification of the trip to the organizer's national authority (e.g. Antarctica NZ), assessment of potential environmental impacts, the ability to cope with environmental emergencies such as oil spills, self-sufficiency, the proper disposal of wastes and respect for the Antarctic environment and research activities. The guidelines outline detailed procedures to be followed during the planning of the trip, when in the Antarctic Treaty area and on completion of the trip.

Individual countries have also introduced measures to minimize effects of tourists. In New Zealand, all people who visit the Ross Dependency must have Prime Ministerial approval from the Environmental Minister, and permission of the Ministry of Foreign Affairs and Trade. In 2008, the South Korean government passed a law in which Korean passport holders must file for permission from the Minister of Foreign Affairs and Trade.

Even with reduced impact per visitor, the increasing number of visitors could still have a considerable effect on the environment. Monitoring of impacts at specific sites can be used to determine whether tourists should be allowed to continue to visit a particular area. Although visits are usually short, they are concentrated into a small number of landing sites and have the potential to destroy parts of a unique environment and to jeopardize scientific research.

== See also ==
- Transport in Antarctica
- Bibliography of Antarctica
