= Kapitan Dranitsyn =

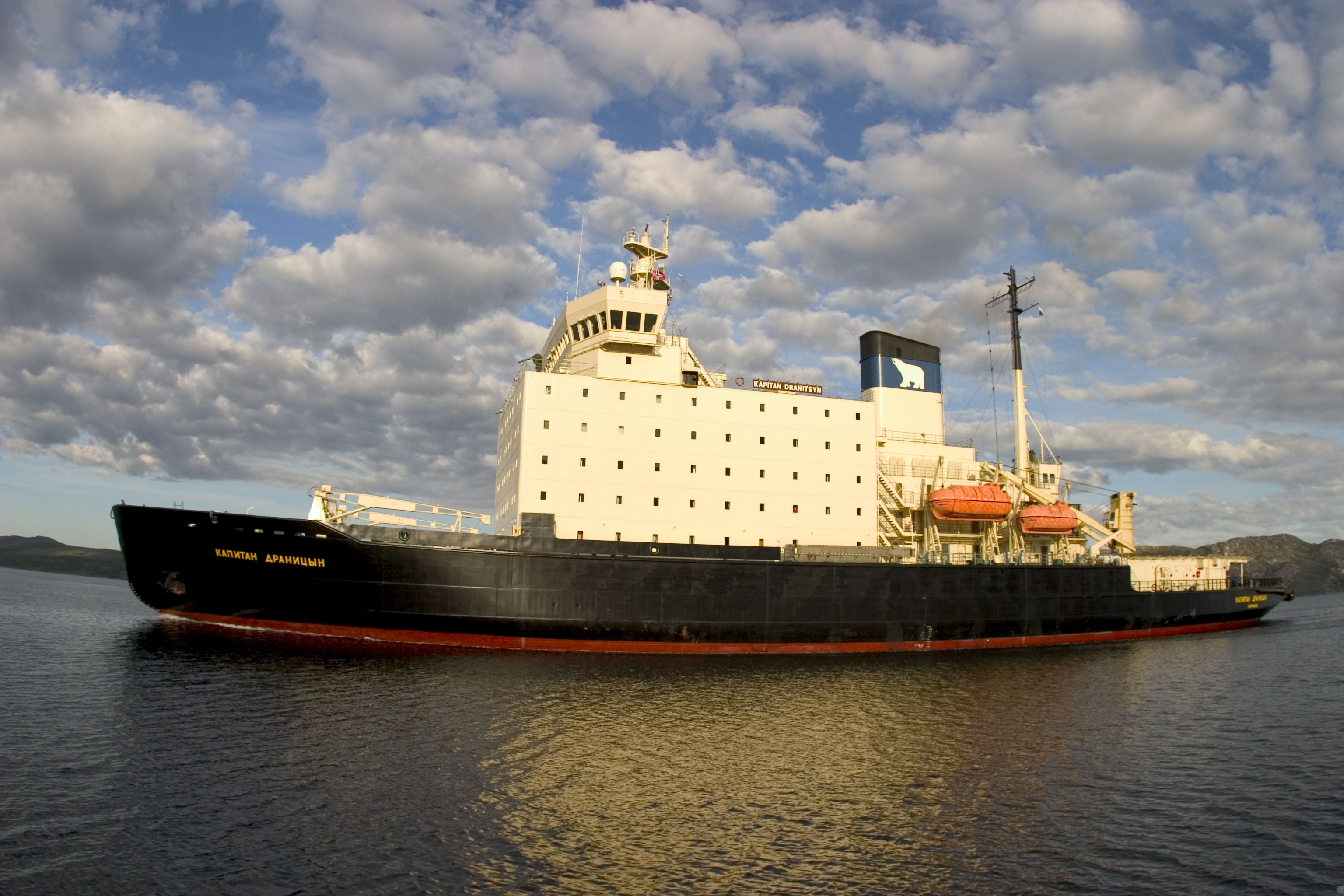
- Kapitan Dranitsyn in 2006

History

Russia
- Name: Kapitan Dranitsyn
- Owner: Russian Federation
- Operator: Murmansk Shipping Company
- Port of registry: Murmansk, Russia
- Builder: Wärtsilä Helsinki Shipyard, Finland
- Yard number: 429
- Launched: 1975
- Completed: 2 December 1980
- Identification: Call sign: UCJP; IMO number: 7824405; MMSI number: 273138300
- Status: In service

General characteristics
- Class & type: Icebreaker
- Tonnage: 12,919 GT; 3,876 NT; 4,515 DWT
- Displacement: 14,917 tons
- Length: 129.02 m (423.3 ft) (overall)
- Beam: 26.54 m (87.1 ft)
- Draft: 8.50 m (27.9 ft)
- Depth: 12.30 m (40.4 ft)
- Ice class: RMRS LL3
- Installed power: 6 × Wärtsilä-Sulzer 9ZL40/48 (6 × 3,040 kW)
- Propulsion: Diesel-electric; three shafts (3 × 5,400 kW); Three 4-bladed fixed-pitch propellers
- Speed: 19 knots (35 km/h; 22 mph) in open water; 2 knots (3.7 km/h; 2.3 mph) in 1.3 m (4.3 ft) level ice
- Capacity: 102 passengers
- Crew: 60
- Aviation facilities: Helicopter deck

Kapitan Dranitsyn (Russian: «Капитан Драницын») is a Russian icebreaker, built in Finland for the former Soviet Union. Since October 1995 she has been used as a research vessel by AARI. She also offers excursions in the Arctic Ocean north of Russia. It's named after German Vasilyevich Dranitsyn (1912–1976), a notable Soviet polar explorer, captain, and significant figure in the Arctic fleet, celebrated for his contributions to Arctic navigation.

== Layout ==
Kapitan Dranitsyn is a conventionally propelled icebreaker built for conditions in the Northern Sea Route and the Baltic Sea. In the last few years she has been modified as a passenger vessel, with 49 outside cabins for 100 passengers. Public accommodation includes spacious lounges, bars, a heated swimming pool, gym, sauna, library and a small hospital.

== Service ==
Icebreaker Kapitan Dranitsyn's main activity is piloting cargo ships on the Northern Sea route. She has also carried out tourist voyages to Franz Josef Land, Spitsbergen, Novaya Zemlya, and Chukotka, to Bering Strait and even to the North Pole (with the help of a nuclear-powered icebreaker). She has completed research cruises into the Barents Sea, the Bering Sea and the Arctic Ocean.

In 1996, she made the first around-the-world voyage. In the same year, the icebreaker participated in rescuing the German passenger ship MS Hanseatic, with 135 passengers aboard.

In 2000, the icebreaker made the Arctic around-the-world voyage on the route Hammerfest (Norway) – Keflavik (Iceland) – Stromfiord (Greenland) – Canadian Arctic regions – Alaska – Chukotka - Murmansk. She made research expeditions to the Laptev Sea in 2002, 2003, and 2004, to place and recover moorings in the NABOS project. In summer of 2002, the Kapitan Dranitsyn took part in shooting an advertising film for the Ford Motor Company in the Spitsbergen Archipelago.

=== 2017 overwintering in Pevek ===
In January 2017, Kapitan Dranitsyn and Admiral Makarov escorted two ice-strengthened cargo ships carrying construction material for berth of the floating nuclear power plant Akademik Lomonosov from Arkhangelsk to Pevek. The mid-winter crossing along the Northern Sea Route was reportedly the first since the Soviet times at this time of the year. However, on the return voyage the convoy encountered a heavy ice barrier at the entrance to Chaunskaya Bay. While the two icebreakers could have overcome the 4 to 5 nautical miles (7 to 9 km; 5 to 6 mi) wide ice field on their own, it would have not been safe for the ice class Arc5 cargo ships Sinegorsk and Iohann Mahmastal that were in ballast.

Consequently, it was decided that the cargo ships should overwinter in Pevek. In addition, Kapitan Dranitsyn remained in Chaunskaya Bay to ensure their safety. The icebound ships were later connected to shore power and the regional government supplied them with fresh water and provisions.

The three vessels were finally able to leave Pevek in May 2017.

=== MOSAiC Expedition ===
During the 2019–2020 MOSAiC Expedition, Kapitan Dranitsyn carried out resupply voyages to the ice-locked German polar research vessel Polarstern.

On 3 February 2020, Kapitan Dranitsyn set off for the second resupply voyage to Polarstern that was, at the time, drifting close to the North Pole. While the diesel-electric icebreaker eventually reached the German research vessel on 28 February and became the first icebreaker ever to operate at such high latitudes in mid-winter under her own power, she had expended most of her fuel reserves while tackling up to 1.6 metres (5 ft) thick ice that had, in places, piled up to hummocks 20 to 30 metres (66 to 98 ft) thick. As a result, Admiral Makarov was dispatched from Murmansk on a refueling mission.
