= Heritage Expeditions =

New Zealand company

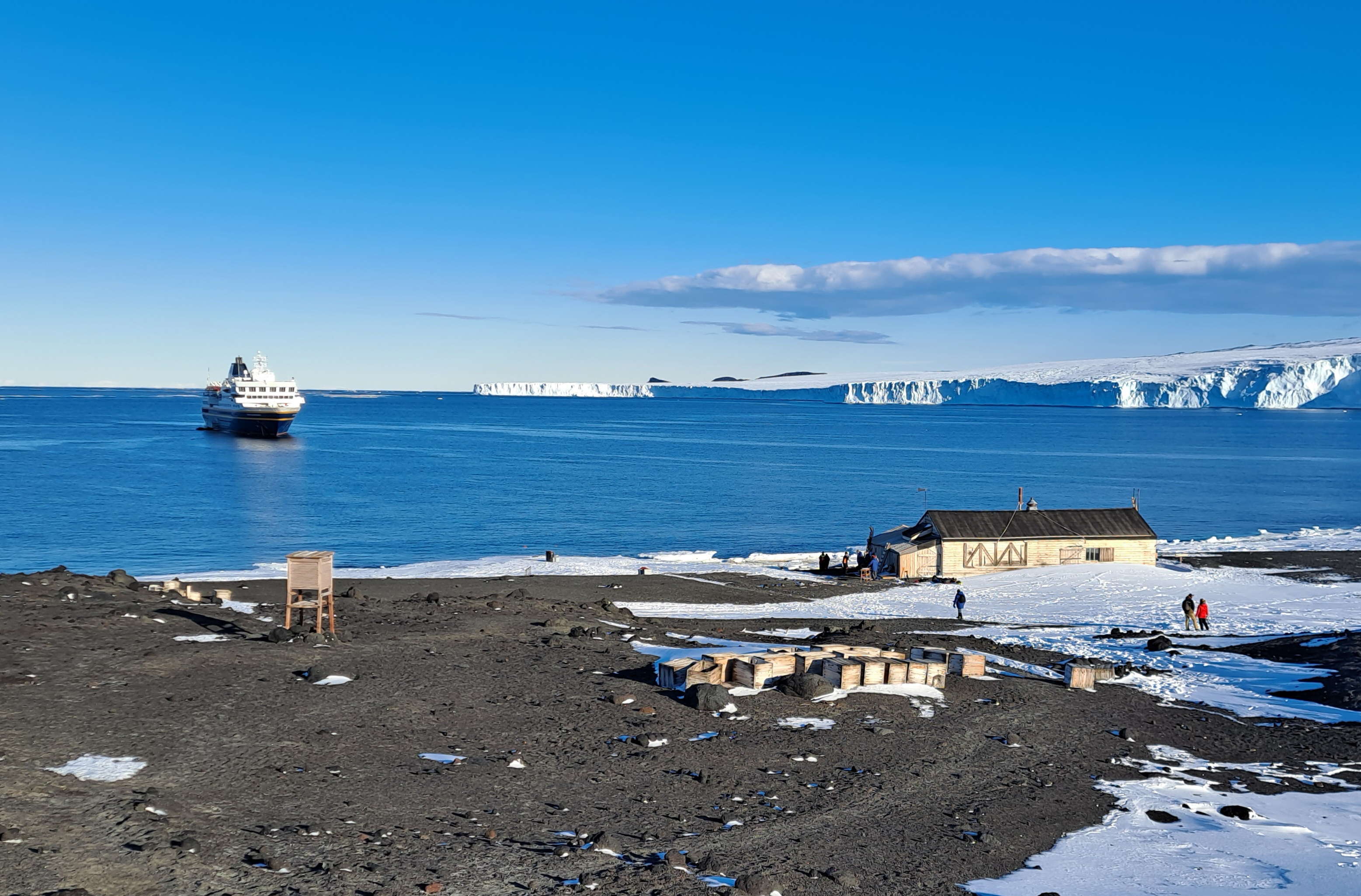
- Heritage Adventurer offshore from Scott's Hut at Cape Evans
- Type: Private
- Industry: Expedition cruises
- Predecessors: Southern Heritage Expeditions
- Founded: 1985
- Founders: Rodney Russ, Shirley Russ
- Headquarters: Christchurch
- Area served: Antarctica, Subantarctic, New Zealand, Australia, South Pacific, Japan
- Key people: Aaron Russ, Commercial Director, Nathan Russ, Operations Director
- Website: heritage-expeditions.com

Heritage Expeditions is an expedition cruise tourism company operating from Christchurch, New Zealand. The company was established by the Russ family, and currently offers a range of expedition cruises and excursions in Antarctica, Subantarctic, New Zealand, Australia, the South Pacific and Japan. As of 2023, the company operates two cruise vessels, the Heritage Adventurer (accommodating 140 passengers), and the Heritage Explorer – an expedition yacht that accommodates 18 passengers. In February 2026, Heritage Expeditions announced that the expedition cruise vessel Exploris One would join their fleet in May 2027 and be renamed as Heritage Discoverer.

== History ==
One of the founders, Rodney Russ, when aged 17, obtained a four-year internship with the New Zealand Wildlife Service. His first visit to the New Zealand Subantarctic Islands was during this period. In the summer of 1972–73, at age 18, Russ had a three-month assignment on the Auckland Islands as a junior technician and Zodiac driver as part of a joint New Zealand, Australian and United States Auckland Island Expedition. After his period as a trainee he became a protected species officer. This gave him wide exposure to conservation management in New Zealand.

While on an expedition to the Campbell Islands in 1975, Russ discovered a Campbell teal, a small flightless and mostly nocturnal duck. It was found on Dent Island, a small rock stack located around 3 km (1.9 mi) off the main Campbell Island. The Campbell teal had been extirpated from the main island as a result of predation by introduced rats, and it had not been seen for 30 years. Conservation efforts began, and following the eradication of introduced pest animals on Campbell Island, the teal population is recovering.

Russ was part of the team that rescued the Chatham Island black robin from extinction. He was also part of an expedition to Stewart Island looking for kākāpō. This venture led on to the establishment of the kākāpō recovery programme. After 11 years with the wildlife service, Russ left to undertake studies at Otago University and Knox Theological College, where he completed a Batchelor of Theology and a degree in Pacific and New Zealand History.

After studying at Otago University, in 1985 Russ established an eco-tourism business, Southern Heritage Tours, to manage an increasing number of guiding and lecturing assignments, including taking guided tours for the Historic Places Trust to areas like the Otago goldfields.

Rodney Russ and his wife Shirley Russ formed the company Southern Heritage Expeditions in 1988. The first vessel that the company chartered for subantarctic island cruises was the Acheron, the same vessel that had taken Russ to the Auckland Islands for his first visit in 1972. This vessel became too small for their operation and they next chartered Pacific Ruby, a vessel that was being operated in the South Pacific by Youth With A Mission. In 1993, the company chartered the 48-berth Russian research ship Akademik Shokalskiy. By 1994, the company had operated more than 50 expedition cruises to the New Zealand Subantarctic Islands and within New Zealand. In 1994, Southern Heritage Expeditions became the first New Zealand-based tour operator to charter a ship to Antarctica, and operated three trips to the ice in the 1994/95 season. In 1997, the company name was shortened to Heritage Expeditions.

In 2003, the company entered a new charter agreement for the Akademik Shokalskiy's sister ship, Professor Khromov that it renamed the Spirit of Enderby. Russ began investigating the possibility of taking expedition cruises to the Russian Far East.

Aaron and Nathan Russ, the two sons of Rodney and Shirley, began going on the expedition tours from when they were about eight years old. In 2018, Aaron and Nathan Russ took over the operation of the business.

During the COVID-19 pandemic in 2020, while the New Zealand borders were closed, Heritage Expeditions was the first company to be granted a border exemption, allowing them to bring The Spirit of Enderby into New Zealand to undertake expedition trips around Fiordland, Stewart Island and the Subantarctic Islands.

In March 2021, the company added a small vessel, named Heritage Explorer, to its fleet. The vessel accommodates 18 passengers and will provide adventure tours around the New Zealand coast.

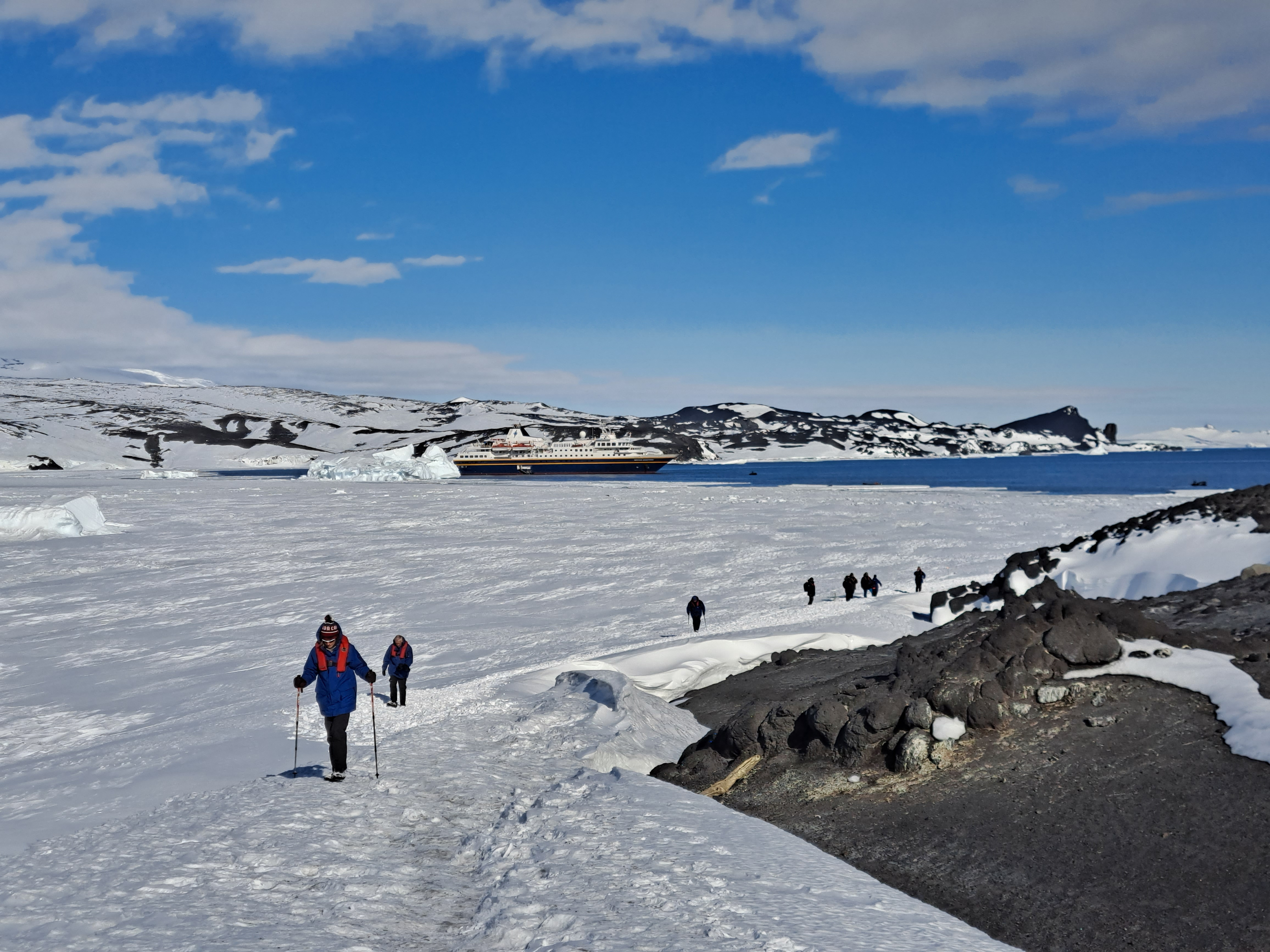
Heritage Adventurer seen from the route to Shackleton's Hut at Cape Royds

In May 2021, Heritage Expeditions announced that it had acquired the former polar expedition cruise vessel Hanseatic; more recently known as RCGS Resolute. Following an extensive refit the vessel was renamed as Heritage Adventurer. During the refit, the passenger accommodation was reduced from 184 to 140. Heritage Expeditions said that this was to provide a more comfortable and spacious experience on board. The vessel began expedition cruises for the company in October 2022.

The company has extended its range of cruise destinations to include the Philippines, Japan, Indonesia and the Kimberley in Western Australia.

In March 2025, the company celebrated its 40-year anniversary with a function onboard Heritage Adventurer in Wellington. The New Zealand Minister of Conservation acknowledged the work of the company in responsible management of expedition tourism. The event also celebrated a research partnership with the South Island iwi Ngāi Tahu.

In February 2026, Heritage Expeditions announced that the expedition cruise vessel Exploris One would join their fleet in May 2027 and be renamed as Heritage Discoverer. Exploris One is an ice-strengthened expedition cruise ship built by Rauma shipyard in Finland and launched in 1989. The company plans to operate the vessel with 130 passengers and an expedition crew of 15. There will be 14 Zodiacs to provide expedition experiences off the vessel. Prior to entering service with Heritage Expeditions cruises, the vessel was chartered out to Polar Latitudes Expeditions.

== Affiliations ==
Heritage Expeditions is a member of the International Association of Antarctica Tour Operators.

== Scholarships ==
The company offers scholarships to young people aged 18–30. These scholarships provide an opportunity for young people to take part in expedition cruises for two thirds off normal rates.

== In popular culture ==
In 2020, Heritage Expeditions provided the transport and support for the making of a slow–TV programme, Go Further South about a voyage on the Akademik Shokalskiy, from New Zealand via the subantartic islands to Antarctica. The production of the programme was supported by Prime TV and NZ On Air. The programme runs for 720 minutes.
