= Hamburg Atlantic Line =

Cruise ship operator

Hamburg Atlantic Line German Atlantic Line Hanseatic Tours
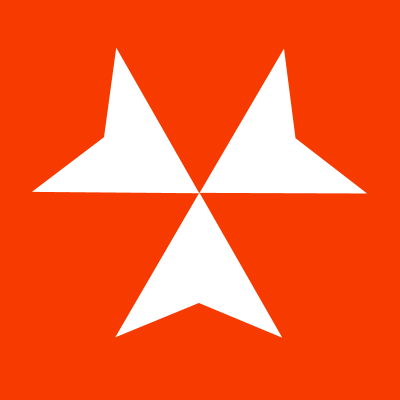
- Hamburg Atlantic logo
- Industry: Ocean liner and cruise ship traffic
- Founded: 1958
- Defunct: 1973 (1st time)
- Reestablished: 1991
- Defunct: 1997 (2nd time)
- Fate: Acquisition
- Successor: Hapag-Lloyd Cruises
- Headquarters: Hamburg, West Germany
- Key people: Axel Bitsch Christensen; Vernicos Eugenides; Dirk Moldenhauer; Suhail Ahmed Gaibi

Hamburg Atlantic Line (German: Hamburg Atlantik Linie) was an ocean liner and cruise ship operating company established in Hamburg, West Germany in 1958 by Axel Bitsch Christensen and Vernicos Eugenides, the latter being the adopted son of Home Lines' founder Eugen Eugenides. In 1966, the company changed its name to German Atlantic Line (German: Deutsche Atlantik Linie). Liner services were abandoned in 1969, after which the company's ships concentrated solely on cruising. Due to the 1973 oil crisis, German Atlantic Line closed down in December 1973.

In 1991 Dirk Moldenhauer, the captain of the last German Atlantic Line ship in service, acquired the rights to the Hamburg/German Atlantic Line logo and established Hanseatic Tours which used the same livery and ship names as the German Atlantic Line. In 1997 Hapag-Lloyd acquired Hanseatic Tours, and their operations were merged to those of Hapag-Lloyd Cruises. The last Hanseatic Tours vessel, MS Hanseatic retained the Hanseatic Tours livery in Hapag-Lloyd service until 2011.

== History ==
=== 1958–1966: Hamburg Atlantic Line ===
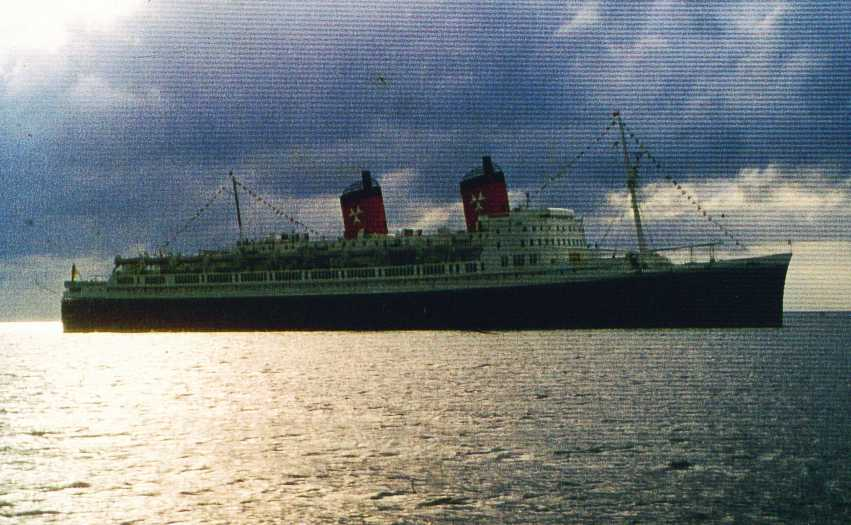
The first TS Hanseatic photographed around 1963

Hamburg Atlantic Line was the brainchild of Axel Bitsch Christensen, a Dane who had been living in Hamburg since 1952, who wanted to establish a new company to offer liner service from West Germany to New York. Christensen convinced his friend Vernicos Eugenides, the chairman of Home Lines, to invest 6 million DM in the new company, making it possible for Christensen to raise enough loan to purchase a ship. Hamburg Atlantic Line acquired their first ship in January 1958 when they purchased the 1930-built RMS Empress of Scotland from Canadian Pacific Steamships. After substantial rebuilding, the ship re-emerged as the first TS Hanseatic in June 1958, and was placed in service connecting Cuxhaven, Germany to New York, United States via Le Havre (France), Southampton (United Kingdom) and Cobh (Ireland). During the winter season she was also used for cruising out of New York to the Caribbean. Coinciding with Hamburg Atlantic beginning transatlantic service, Home Lines ceased transatlantic service so that the two companies in which Vernicos Eugenides had large investments would not compete with each other. After a good year in the transatlantic service in 1959, passenger numbers begun to drop due to competition from air traffic. By 1965 the Hanseatic made only eight round crossings, spending the rest of the year cruising.

Already in 1962 Axel Bitsch Christensen had begun planning for a new ship to replace the Hanseatic. He had trouble securing a loan to fund the new building, but was not discouraged and drew up an unusual plan for gathering funds. A new company, German Atlantic Line, was established; shares of the new company were offered to past Hamburg Atlantic passengers, and enough funds for the new ships were gathered using this method. However, before an order could be placed for the new ship, the Hanseatic caught fire on 6 September 1966 while in New York harbour. There were no casualties, but after the hulk of the ship was towed back to Germany, she was deemed too expensive to repair and was sent to scrappers. An order for the new TS Hamburg was placed with Deutsche Werft during the following month, but the company needed another ship to operate until the new ship would be completed.

=== 1966–1973: German Atlantic Line ===
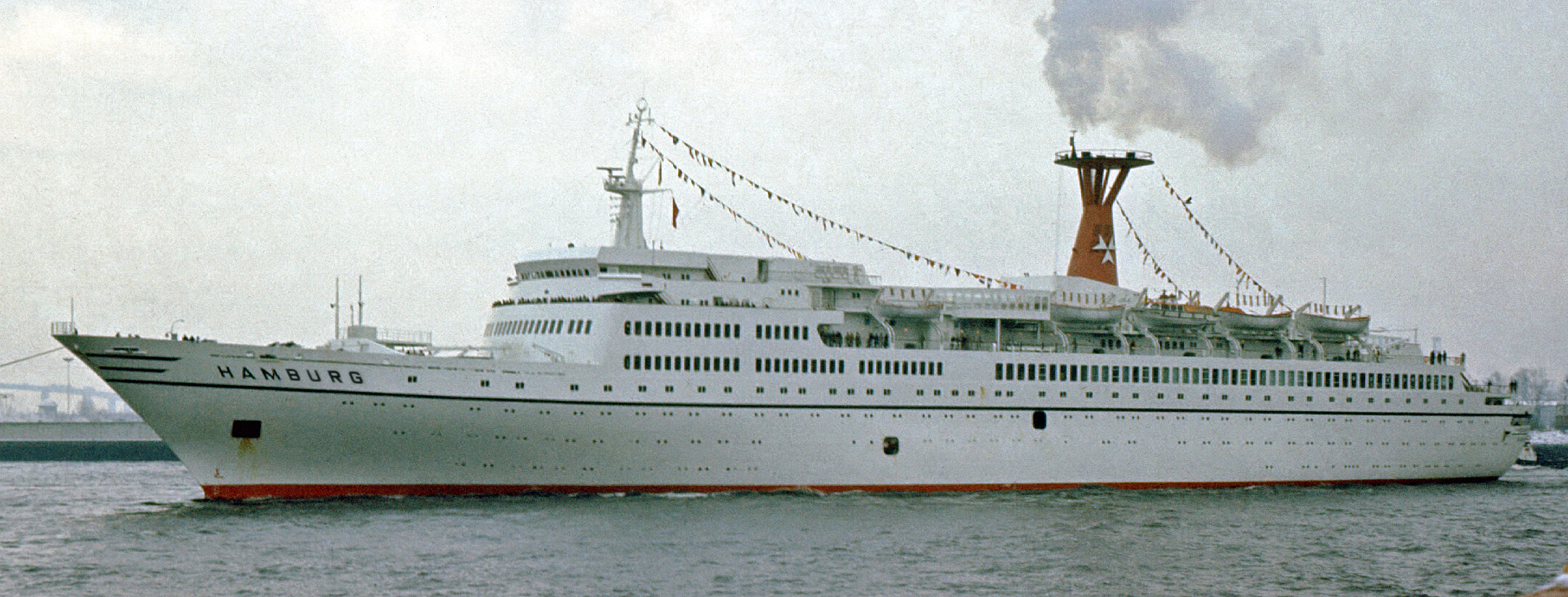
A manipulated photograph showing the TS Hamburg in German Atlantic Line colours

Hamburg Atlantic Line was without a ship from the loss of the first Hanseatic until November 1967, when the three-year-old SS Shalom was purchased from the Israel-based ZIM Lines. By this time the decision was made to abandon the name Hamburg Atlantic Line, and the company began to be marketed as the German Atlantic Line. The former Shalom, that had been renamed TS Hanseatic, set on a crossing from Hamburg to New York on 16 December 1967 with invited guests on board. After the initial crossing she began making cruises out of New York. In 1968 the German Atlantic Line decided to abandon transatlantic service, concentrating solely on cruising. The Hanseatic did still cross the Atlantic twice a year on repositioning trips between Europe and America.

The new TS Hamburg was delivered to German Atlantic Line on 20 March 1969, entering service on 28 March 1969 with a cruise from Hamburg to South America. She was the first major German-built, German-flagged passenger ship to enter service since 1938. By this time the company was collaborating with Holland America Line, who acted as German Atlantic's agents in North America.

Around the time of the Hamburg's delivery German Atlantic was faced with bad times financially. 75% of their income was made in US dollars, but during the late 60s and early 70s the Deutsche Mark gained value heavily compared to the Dollar. At the same time both crew expenses and fuel prices rose dramatically. Due to the raising expenses the company was forced to seek out a joint venture with Hapag-Lloyd, but nothing came of this. By September 1973 the company's debts were estimated at 50-70 million DM, so when Home Lines lost their SS Homeric and expressed interest in buying the Hanseatic as a replacement, German Atlantic had no choice but to sell the ship or face bankruptcy. On 25 September 1973 the Hanseatic was sold and renamed SS Doric. On the same date the Hamburg was in turn renamed Hanseatic, but at the same time plans were being drawn to sell her to Hapag-Lloyd.

Negotiations about the sale of the third Hanseatic continued with Hapag-Lloyd, as well as a potential buyer from Japan, while debts continued to accumulate. On 1 December 1973 German Atlantic Line was forced to cease operations completely. The Hanseatic was laid up and eventually sold to the Black Sea Shipping Company of the Soviet Union (via an American intermediary) in 1974, becoming their TS Maxim Gorkiy. The Maxim Gorkiy spent most of her subsequent career under charter to various West German (and after German reunification, German) tour operators.

=== 1991–1997: Hanseatic Tours ===
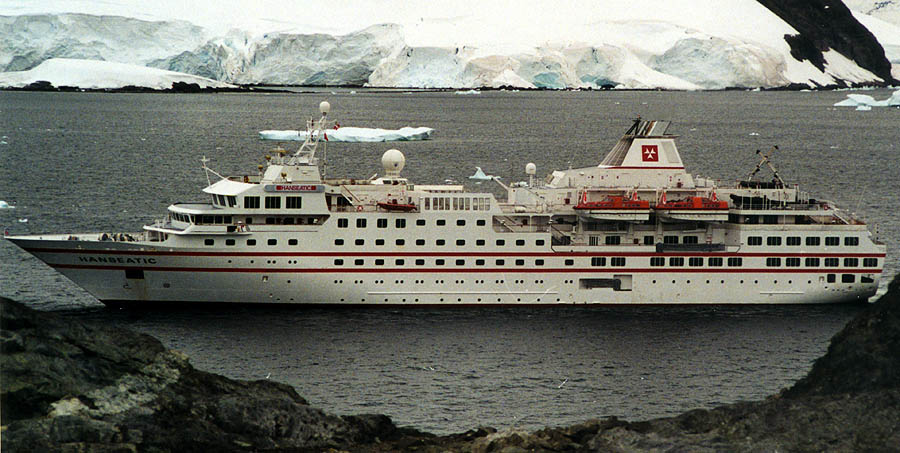
MS Hanseatic in Paradise Bay, Antarctica, February 2001, still sporting Hanseatic Tours livery

In 1991 Dirk Moldenhauer – the last captain of the third Hanseatic – purchased the rights to the logo used by Hamburg/German Atlantic Line, as well as the right to use the name "Hanseatic", and founded a new expedition cruise operator Hanseatic Tours. Initially the new company made an agreement to charter the MS Renaissance Five, at the time still under construction, from Renaissance Cruises. Before delivery the ship was renamed MS Hanseatic Renaissance and entered service in Hanseatic Tours colours in May 1991. The Hanseatic Renaissance remained in Hanseatic service until 1992, when she was returned to her owners.

On 23 March 1993 Hanseatic Tours chartered the 1991-built MS Society Adventurer and renamed her MS Hanseatic. Although built two years previously, the ship has never seen active service as the company that had ordered her went bankrupt before she was completed, and the ship had been laid up until chartered to Hanseatic Tours. The fourth Hanseatic entered service on 27 March 1993 when she set on a cruise from Hamburg to Sevilla. Hanseatic Tours continued operations with one ship until 1997, when the company was purchased by Hapag-Lloyd, with Dirk Moldenhauer becoming one of the chiefs of Hapag-Lloyds cruise operations. Even after entering service with Hapag-Lloyd Cruises, the fourth Hanseatic retained her name and Hanseatic Tours livery.

== Ships ==
| Ship | IMO-number | Built | In service for HAL/GAL/HT | Flag | Gross register tonnage | Status today | Image |
|---|---|---|---|---|---|---|---|
| TS Hanseatic | 5514232 | 1930 | 1958–1966 | West Germany | 30,030 GRT | Burnt 1966, subsequently scrapped. | |
| TS Hanseatic | 5321679 | 1964 | 1967–1973 | West Germany | 25,338 GRT | Sunk 2001 | |
| TS Hamburg; TS Hanseatic | 6810627 | 1969 | 1969–1973; 1973 | West Germany | 25,022 GRT | Scrapped in Alang, India in 2009 | |
| MS Hanseatic Renaissance | | 1991 | 1991–1992 | Italy | 4,280 GRT | Since 2001 sailing as MS Spirit of Oceanus for Cruise West. | |
| MS Hanseatic | 9000168 | 1991 | 1993–1997 | Bahamas | 8,378 GRT | Since 1997 sailing for Hapag-Lloyd. Retained Hanseatic Tours livery until 2011. | |
