= Exploris One =

Expedition ship

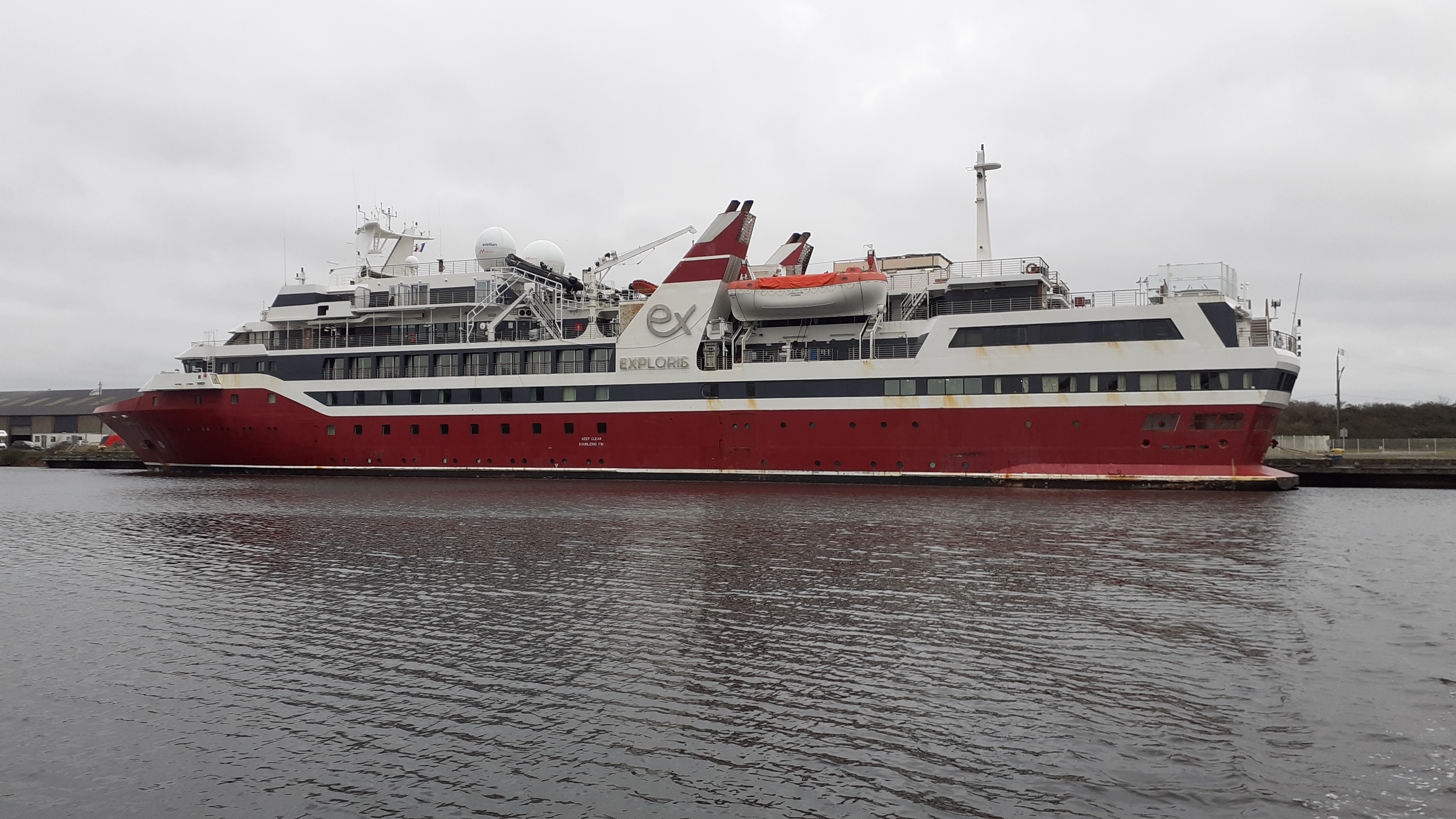
- Exploris One in Caen, France on 11 December 2025

History
- Name: 1989–1990: Delfin Clipper; 1990–1992: Sally Clipper; 1992: Baltic Clipper; 1992–1997: Delfin Star; 1997–2002: Dream 21; 2002–2004: World Discoverer; 2004–2005: World Adventurer; 2005–2008: World Discoverer; 2008–2011: Prince Albert II; 2011–2023: Silver Explorer; 2023–present: Exploris One; 2027– (planned): Discoverer
- Operator: 2002?–2007: Society Expeditions; 2007–2011: Silversea Cruises; 2011–2023: Filipino Owner; 2023–2026: Exploris; 2026–present: Polar Latitudes Expeditions
- Port of registry: Nassau, Bahamas
- Ordered: 1 May 1986
- Builder: Rauma-Repola, Rauma, Finland
- Cost: $50 million
- Yard number: 304
- Laid down: 21 October 1988
- Launched: 3 February 1989
- Completed: June 1989
- Identification: IMO number: 8806747; Call sign: CQ2915; MMSI number: 311562000
- Status: In service

General characteristics
- Tonnage: 6,158 GT; 1,847 NT; 635 DWT
- Displacement: 3,768 t (3,708 long tons)
- Length: 108.1 m (354 ft 8 in)
- Beam: 15.6 m (51 ft 2 in)
- Draught: 4.38 m (14 ft 4 in)
- Depth: 9.6 m (31 ft 6 in)
- Decks: 7 (5 passenger)
- Ice class: Finnish-Swedish ice class 1A
- Installed power: 2 × Wärtsilä Vasa 6R32D (2 × 2,250 kW)
- Propulsion: Two shafts; controllable pitch propellers
- Speed: 14 knots (26 km/h; 16 mph)
- Capacity: 144 passengers
- Crew: 118

Exploris One is an ice-strengthened expedition cruise ship built by Rauma shipyard in Finland. She was launched in 1989 as MS Delfin Clipper and was the first luxury cruise vessel built at this shipyard. Over the period 1989 to 2001 she operated under several names before being acquired by Society Expeditions, who operated her from 2001 to 2007 under the names World Discoverer and World Adventurer. In 2007, she was purchased by Silversea Cruises and after a major refit was renamed Prince Albert II, becoming the first expedition cruise vessel in the Silversea line. In April 2011, she was renamed Silver Explorer.

After 15 years in the Silversea fleet, Silver Explorer was sold to Exploris Cruises and Expeditions in January 2022. She was transferred to Exploris in September 2023 and began sailings as Exploris One in December 2023. Exploris was liquidated in November 2025 and the ship was sold at auction to the Nordic Group.

In February 2026, Heritage Expeditions, an expedition cruise company operating from Christchurch, New Zealand, announced that the vessel would join their expedition cruise fleet and be renamed as Heritage Discoverer, with voyages commencing in May 2027.

== General characteristics ==
The ship is an Ice Class 1A rated passenger vessel. She is 108.11 m (354.7 ft) in length, with a beam of 15.83 m (51.9 ft) and a draught of 4.38 m (14.4 ft). The main engines are Wärtsilä-Vasa type 6R32D, each producing 2,250 kW (3,020 hp) at 750 rpm. Propulsion is provided by two variable pitch propellers. The ship has two Wärtsilä auxiliary engines each rated at 1,000 kW driving 440 V 60 Hz generators rated at 840 kW.

The ship has five decks. At the time of commissioning in 1989 she had 178 passenger cabins. These included eight suites equipped with private Jacuzzis. Many of the cabins were single, intended to suit the market for conference passengers. The original facilities included conference seating for 150 people, a shop and casino, a nightclub/disco, a beauty salon, medical unit, and sauna, Jacuzzi and swimming pool.

Accommodation was reduced to 132 passengers during a major refit in 2008. Following the refurbishment, the most common cabin size was 200 ft^{2} (19 m^{2}), but there were suites of up to 675 ft^{2} (62.7 m^{2}). Another extensive interior refurbishment was completed in 2017, including converting 8 large suites into 16 smaller suites with inter-connecting doors. The revised accommodation had capacity for up to 144 passengers in 72 cabins.

By 2019, the vessel was operating with a fleet of 14 Zodiacs.

== Career ==
The ship was built by Rauma-Repola, at the Rauma shipyard, Finland, and handed over to her owners Delfin Cruises as the MS Delphin Clipper on 1 June 1989. She was the first luxury cruise vessel built at this shipyard. In 1990 she was chartered by Sally Cruise to replace a vessel destroyed in a shipyard fire, and was renamed MS Sally Clipper. She operated under several other names between 1992 and 2002 before being acquired by Society Expeditions. They operated her from 2002 to 2007 under the names World Adventurer and World Discoverer. In 2003, the ship was seized by the bank holding a mortgage on the vessel. It had been chartered by Society Expeditions through a holding company, but following the seizure, Society Expeditions International purchased the ship for approximately $USD30 million. In June 2004, the vessel was again seized by creditors, and Society Expeditions filed for bankruptcy.

She was purchased by Silversea Cruises in autumn 2007, and underwent a multimillion-pound refit at Fincantieri, Trieste. Passenger accommodation was reduced from 175 to 132. In June 2008, at a ceremony in Monte Carlo attended by Prince Albert II of Monaco, she was renamed Prince Albert II. She then sailed to London to embark passengers for an inaugural cruise.

Silver Explorer operated polar adventure cruises lasting between 10 and 27 days. In the summer she cruised in the Arctic Circle and the Northeast Passage with calls at the Svalbard archipelago, Iceland and Greenland. During the northern hemisphere autumn and winter, she cruised off South America and Antarctica. Prince Albert II was renamed Silver Explorer in late April 2011. Silver Explorer was refurbished in 2017, expanding its passenger capacity to 144 in 72 cabins.

In 2018, the ship was chartered by a group of 130 golfers for a golfing tour of the Pacific Northwest. She anchored at Coos Bay and docked in North Bend. In 2019, the Silver Explorer made the first voyage by a Silversea vessel through the Northwest Passage, travelling in Arctic pack ice accompanied by a Russian icebreaker. In December 2019, the ship made a maiden voyage to Sokcho, South Korea as the first Silversea ship to visit the port.

In January 2022, after 15 years in the Silversea fleet, the ship was sold to a French expedition cruise company Exploris Cruises and Expeditions. She was transferred to Exploris in September 2023. Silver Explorer completed its final cruise for Silversea on 19 November 2023, and the maiden voyage as Exploris One departed Valparaiso on 23 December 2023. Exploris Cruises and Expeditions was liquidated in November 2025.

Exploris One was sold at auction for 4.5 M Euro, and purchased by the Nordic Group based in Hamburg. In February 2026, Heritage Expeditions, an expedition cruise tourism company operating from Christchurch, New Zealand, announced that the vessel would join their expedition cruise fleet in May 2027 and be renamed as Heritage Discoverer. The company plans to operate the vessel with 130 passengers and an expedition crew of 15. There will be 14 Zodiacs to provide expedition experiences off the vessel. Prior to entering service with Heritage Expeditions cruises, the vessel was chartered out to Polar Latitudes Expeditions.

== Incidents ==
In June 2019, as the ship was sailing into Bering Sea it became entangled in a fishing net which caused propeller damage, forcing the ship to drydock for repairs. On 15 March 2020, during the COVID-19 pandemic on cruise ships, the ship docked in Castro, Chile, with 111 passengers and 120 crew, after an 83-year-old man fell ill and tested positive for COVID-19.
