= International Association of Antarctica Tour Operators =

The International Association of Antarctica Tour Operators (IAATO) was founded in 1991 by seven companies. The primary goal of the association is to "advocate and promote the practice of safe and environmentally responsible private-sector travel to the Antarctic".

Since the group's inception membership has grown to over 100 members. In addition there are tour groups working outside the association which may not follow its safety and environmental guidelines.

The need for an association like the IAATO is that eight countries have made territorial claims in Antarctica. However, no country recognizes the claim of any other country. In fact, in some cases, countries claim the same piece of the continent. Therefore, it is rarely clear what authority is in charge. This has left the Antarctic tourism industry largely self-regulated. Hence the need for an organization like the IAATO.

There is an IAATO website that has information on the Antarctic Treaty, visitor guidelines, visitor briefing videos, tourism statistics and more.
