= TS Maxim Gorkiy =

Russian cruise ship, 1969–2008

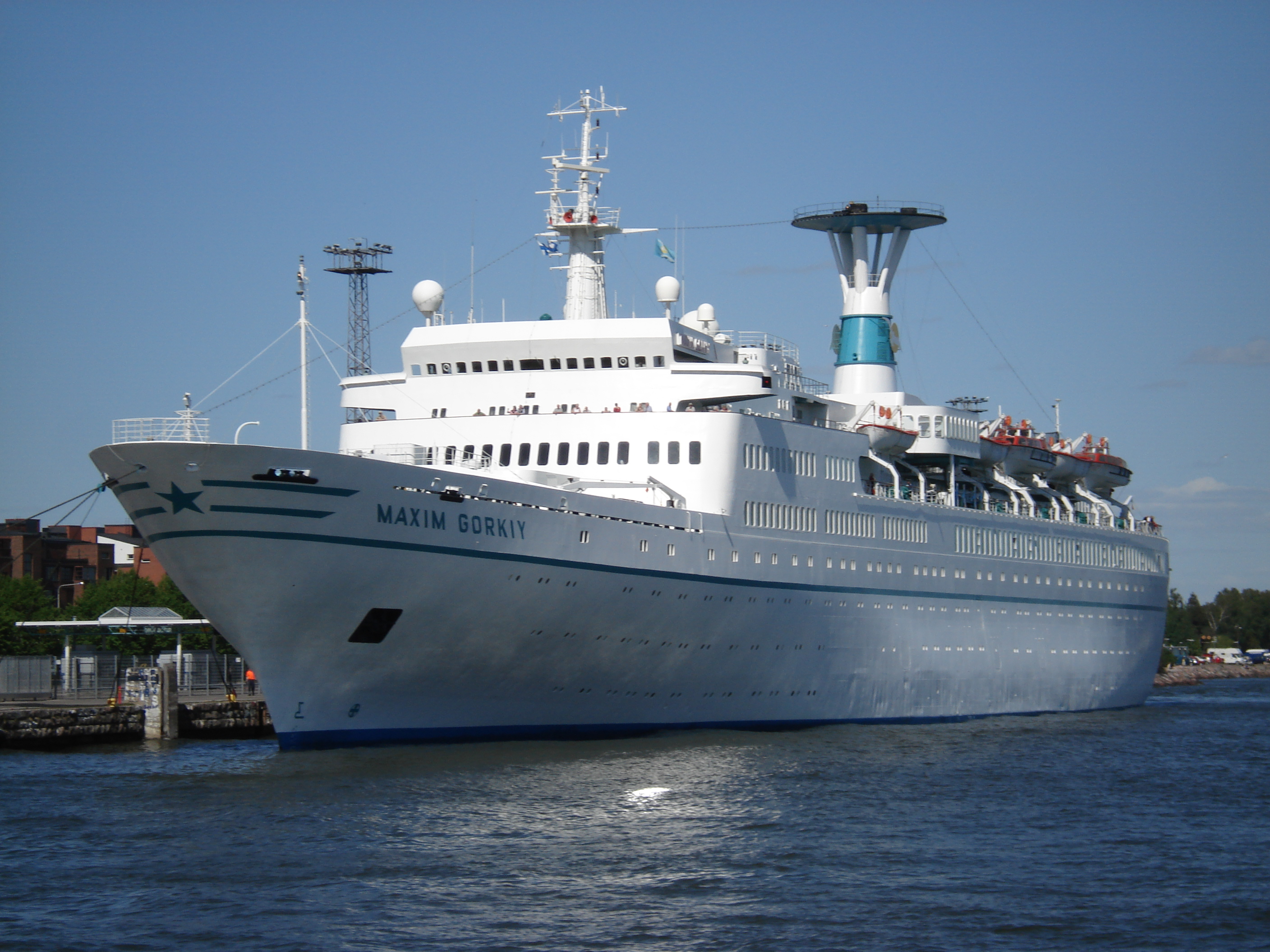
- TS Maxim Gorkiy in Helsinki, Finland in June 2006.

History
- Name: 1969–1973: Hamburg; 1973–1974: Hanseatic; 1974–1992: Maksim Gorkiy; 1992–2009: Maxim Gorkiy
- Namesake: The city of Hamburg (1st name); The Hanseatic League (2nd name); Maxim Gorky (3rd name)
- Owner: 1969–1974: German Atlantic Line; 1974–1992: Black Sea Shipping Company; 1992–1996: Belata Shipping; 1996–2008: Maxim Gorkiy Shipping Co (Sovcomflot); 2008–2009: Orient Lines
- Operator: 1969–1973: German Atlantic Line; 1973–1974: laid up; 1974–1988: Black Sea Shipping Company; 1988–2008: Phoenix Reisen
- Port of registry: 1969–1974: Hamburg, West Germany; 1974–1992: Odesa, Soviet Union; 1992–2009: Nassau, Bahamas
- Ordered: November 1966
- Builder: Howaldtswerke-Deutsche Werft, Hamburg, West Germany
- Cost: £ 5.6 million
- Yard number: 825
- Launched: 21 February 1968
- Acquired: 20 March 1969
- Maiden voyage: 28 March 1969
- In service: 28 March 1969
- Out of service: 30 November 2008
- Identification: IMO number: 6810627
- Fate: Scrapped in Alang, India, 2009

General characteristics (as built)
- Type: Ocean liner/cruise ship
- Tonnage: 25,022 GRT; 5,677 DWT
- Length: 194.72 m (638 ft 10 in)
- Beam: 26.57 m (87 ft 2 in)
- Draught: 8.27 m (27 ft 2 in)
- Depth: 16.40 m (53 ft 10 in)
- Ice class: 1 A
- Installed power: 2 × AEG steam turbines; 16,668 kW (combined)
- Propulsion: Twin propellers
- Speed: 22 knots (41 km/h; 25 mph)
- Capacity: 790 in planned liner service; 652 in cruise service

General characteristics (2006)
- Type: Cruise ship
- Tonnage: 24,981 GT; 5,800 DWT
- Decks: 10 (passenger accessible)
- Speed: 18 knots (33 km/h; 21 mph)
- Capacity: 788 passengers
- Crew: 340

TS Maxim Gorkiy was a cruise ship owned by Sovcomflot, Russia, under long-term charter to Phoenix Reisen, Germany. She was built in 1969 by Howaldtswerke-Deutsche Werft, Hamburg, West Germany for the German Atlantic Line as TS Hamburg. In late 1973 she was very briefly renamed TS Hanseatic. The following year she was sold to the Black Sea Shipping Company, Soviet Union and received the name Maksim Gorkiy in honour of the writer, renamed to Maxim Gorkiy after the collapse of the Soviet Union in 1991.

On 20 August 2008 Maxim Gorkiy was sold to Orient Lines. She was due to enter service with her new owners on 15 April 2009 under the name TS Marco Polo II, but in November 2008 the relaunch of the Orient Lines brand was cancelled. On 8 January 2009 the ship was sold for scrap, and she was beached at Alang, India on 26 February 2009.

Although never used as such, the ship was originally planned as a dual ocean liner/cruise ship, for service between Hamburg and New York City as well as cruising. She was the first major passenger liner built in Germany since 1938. On entering service for the Black Sea Shipping Company, she became the first four-star cruise ship operated under the Soviet flag.

Several variants of the ship's name were used through her career. Some sources refer to her with the prefix TS (turbine ship) instead of SS (steamship), while her final name Maxim Gorkiy was also written as Maksim Gorkiy and Maxim Gorki. She should not be confused with any of the Soviet era cruise liners of the Ivan Franko class, the so-called "poet" or "writer" class, including the now scrapped Marco Polo.

== Concept and construction ==
The Hamburg Atlantic Line had begun operations in 1958, operating the former Canadian Pacific liner Empress of Scotland as the first SS Hanseatic on a route connecting Cuxhaven, Germany to New York City. In 1965 the company decided to order a replacement for Hanseatic. In order to finance this, a new company German Atlantic Line was founded and shares of the new company were offered to past Hamburg Atlantic Line passengers. The unusual scheme was successful, and an order was placed for the new ship at Deutsche Werft, Hamburg in November 1966. Before the ship was delivered, Deutsche Werft merged with Howaldtswerke to form Howaldtswerke-Deutsche Werft.

The new ship, eventually named Hamburg, was originally planned to operate both as an ocean liner and as a cruise ship, similarly to Queen Elizabeth 2, under construction at the time. However, by the time Hamburg was delivered in March 1969, German Atlantic Line, as the whole company was known by then, had abandoned liner service and Hamburg was used for full-time cruising. The first Hanseatic had burnt in September 1966, and instead of replacing her Hamburg now entered service alongside the second Hanseatic that had been purchased from Zim Lines in 1967.

The ship's interiors were modernized in 1988, however, most public spaces remained in the same configuration as they were when the ship was built until the end of her career.

== Service history ==
=== With German Atlantic Line ===
The new flagship of the German Atlantic Line, Hamburg, set on her maiden voyage from Cuxhaven, Germany on a cruise to South America on 28 March 1969. She was the first major German-built passenger liner to enter service since 1938. Until 1973 Hamburg was used for cruising around Europe and the Americas alongside the second Hanseatic.

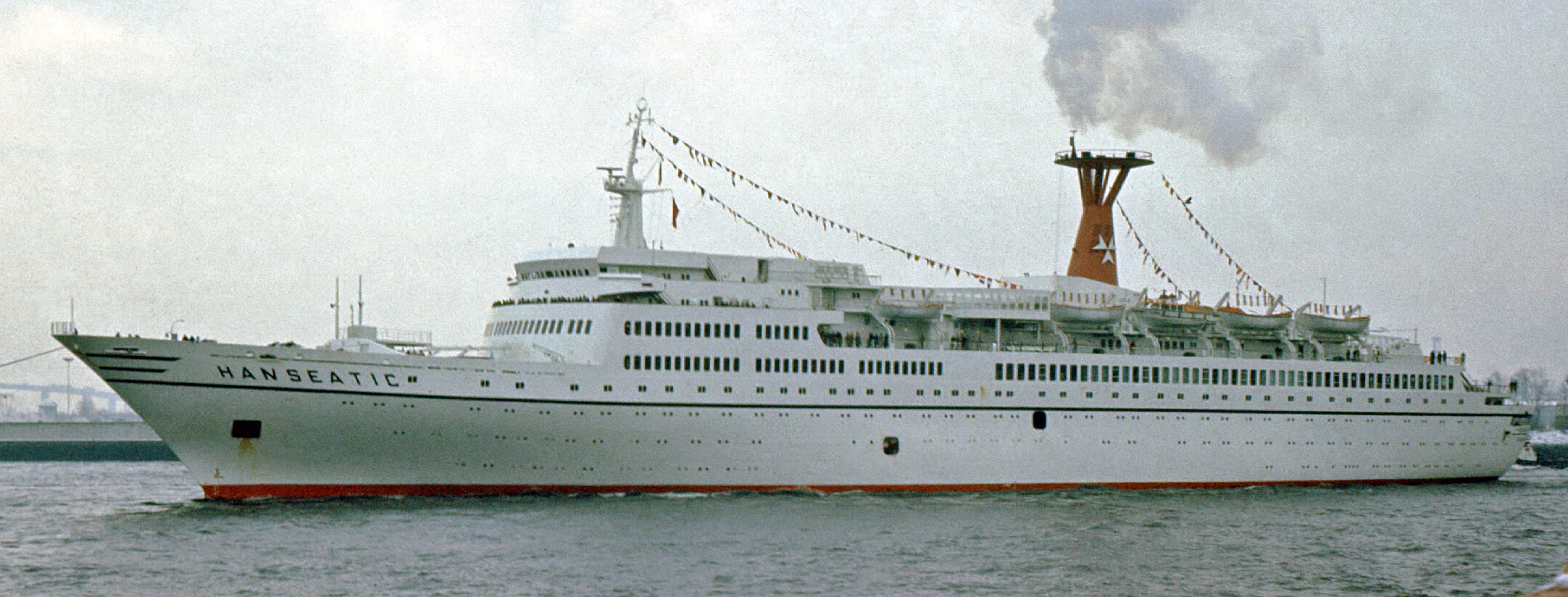
TS Hanseatic in colours of German Atlantic Line

The operations of the German Atlantic Line were badly hit by the oil crises in 1973. Home Lines had lost their SS Homeric in a fire earlier that year, and Hanseatic was sold to the Home Lines on 25 September 1973 as Doric. On the same day the second Hanseatic was sold, Hamburg was in turn renamed Hanseatic, becoming the third ship to bear the name. Her career under the new name proved short however, as already on 1 December 1973 German Atlantic Line ceased operations, the newest Hanseatic was laid up in Hamburg and placed for sale. Japanese Ryutsu Kaiun KK were interested in buying the ship, but that deal did not materialise.

The Museum for Hamburg History displays a model of the ship in her SS Hamburg guise.

=== With Black Sea Shipping Company ===
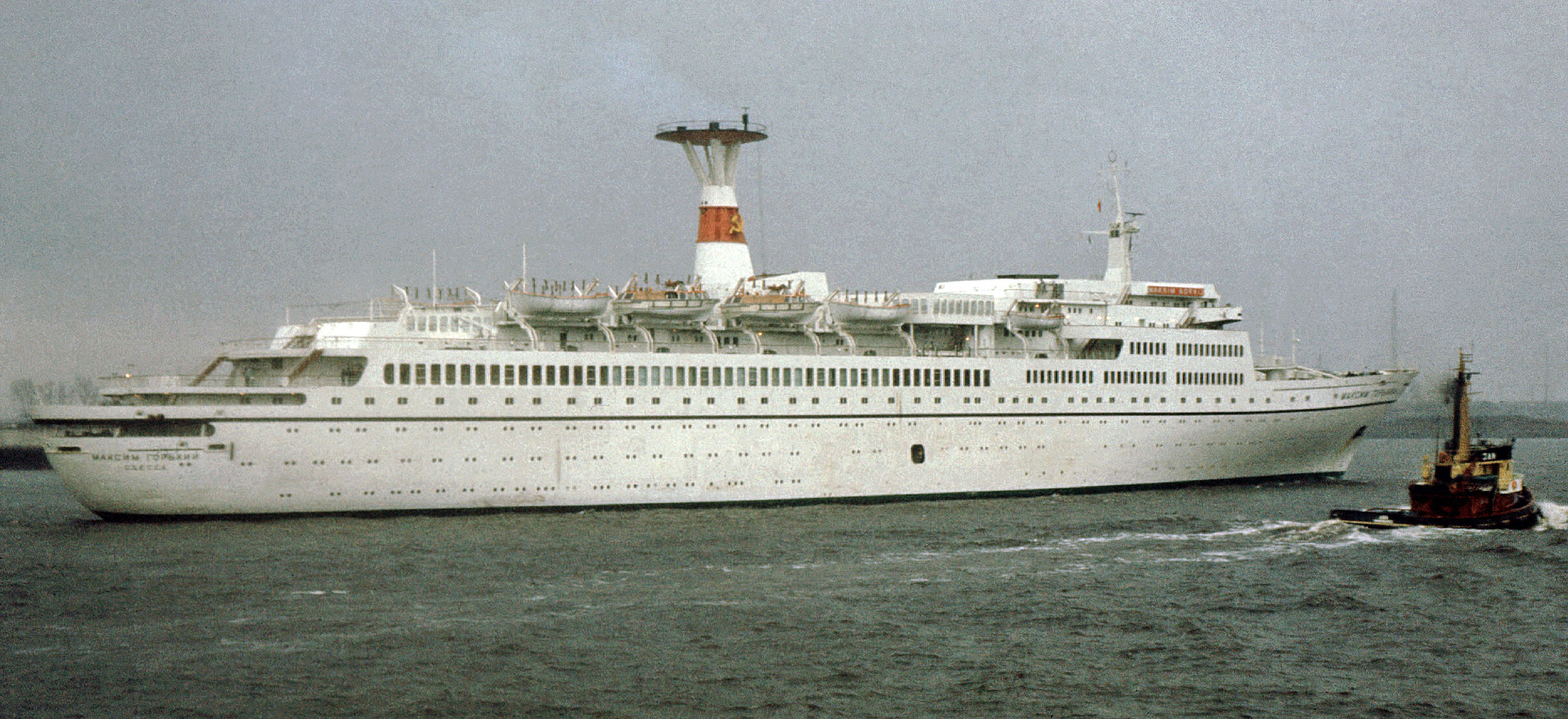
TS Maxim Gorkiy in the colours of the Black Sea Shipping Co.

On 25 January 1974 Hanseatic was sold to Robin International, New York City, who immediately re-sold her to the Black Sea Shipping Company. Renamed Maksim Gorkiy, she was at the time the most luxurious ship to sail under the flag of the Soviet Union. Before the ship entered service for the Black Sea Shipping Company, she was chartered to a British film crew and used to portray the fictional SS Britannic in the film Juggernaut. From the beginning of her career under the Soviet flag, she was often chartered to West German tour operators.

In June the ship began twice-monthly Caribbean cruises from New York, and was attacked twice while berthed in San Juan, Puerto Rico. On 28 December 1974 a grenade was thrown onto the deck injuring two crew members. Anti-Castro Cuban exiles claimed responsibility. On 1 November 1975 two bombs attached to the starboard hull exploded, producing holes about 35 feet forward of the rudder post. No one was injured and she continued the cruise to Saint Thomas and New York before being dry docked for repairs.

An incident of a different nature took place while the ship was inbound to New York on 18 September 1980, when the port authorities declined the ship's right to make port due to the Soviet Union's involvement in Afghanistan at the time. Instead of entering port Maxim Gorky was forced to lay at anchor outside Staten Island, while port ferries were used to bring her passengers to the city.

=== With Phoenix Reisen ===
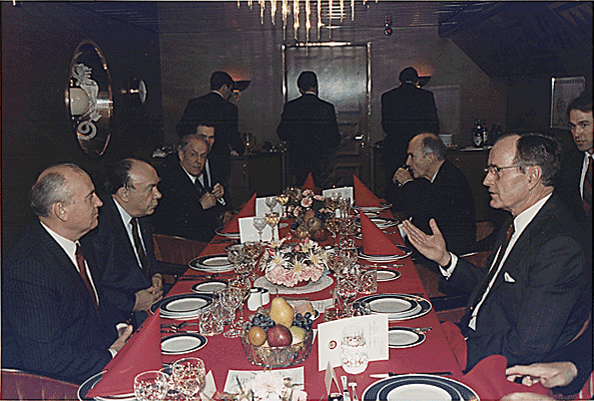
Mikhail Gorbachev and George H. W. Bush on board the Maxim Gorky during the 1989 Malta Summit.

In September 1988 Maksim Gorkiy was chartered to Phoenix Reisen of West Germany for twenty years. Despite being in service for Phoenix, the ship maintained her mainly Soviet crew (later Russian/Ukrainian) and the Soviet Union's funnel colours. Even after the collapse of the Soviet Union she was painted in the new colours of independent Russia, not those of Phoenix Reisen.

In 1989 Maksim Gorkiy made headlines twice. On around midnight on 19 June 1989 she hit an ice floe while on a cruise near Svalbard and began to sink rapidly. All passengers and a third of the crew were instructed to abandon ship, while the Norwegian coast guard vessel Senja was dispatched to assist. By the time Senja arrived on the scene some three hours later, Maksim Gorkiy was already partially submerged. 350 passengers were evacuated from the lifeboats and ice floes by helicopters and Senja. Senja took on 700 people.

They were taken to Svalbard and later flown back to Germany. Meanwhile, the crew of Senja had managed to stop Maksim Gorkiy's sinking, by which time her bow had already sunk down to the level of the main deck. On 21 June, Maksim Gorkiy was towed to Svalbard, where quick repairs were made to make her watertight enough to survive a return to Germany for repairs. The ship sailed to Lloyd Werft, Bremerhaven under her own power, and after repairs was back on service on 17 August 1989.

Maksim Gorkiy made news again in December of the same year, when she was used as a venue for an international summit between George H. W. Bush and Mikhail Gorbachev at Malta. On 26 July 1991, while on a cruise to Svalbard, a television exploded on board, injuring three people. In December of the same year the ship was re-registered to Nassau, Bahamas as Maxim Gorkiy. Following the collapse of the Soviet Union, she was transferred to the fleet of Sovcomflot, who continued chartering her to Phoenix Reisen.

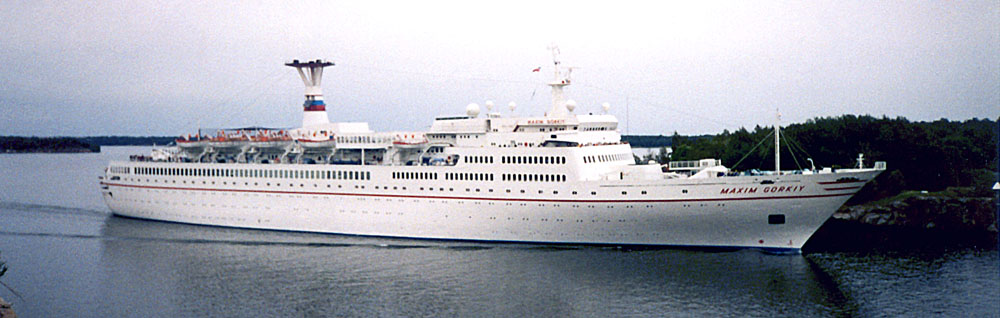
TS Maxim Gorkiy departing Helsinki, Finland in Sovcomflot colours, c. 2004.

While being drydocked at Blohm+Voss in December 2005 Maxim Gorkiy finally received the green/white livery of Phoenix Reisen. Her long-term charter to Phoenix Reisen ended on 30 November 2008, and Phoenix Reisen did not extend the charter due to the high fuel expenses of operating a steam turbine-powered ship. The future of the ship remained uncertain for some time due to the new requirements of the SOLAS regulations coming into effect in 2010, the meeting of which would have required large-scale reconstruction for Maxim Gorkiy.

On 20 August 2008 it was reported that the re-formed Orient Lines had purchased the ship. Orient Lines planned to rename the ship Marco Polo II and refit her to comply with the SOLAS 2010 requirements. She was due to enter service with her new owners on 15 April 2009. However, on 19 November 2008 the relaunch of their cruise operations was delayed indefinitely due to the 2008 financial crisis.

Following the termination of her charter to Phoenix Reisen in November 2008, Maxim Gorkiy was laid up at Eleusis, Greece. In December 2008 plans were made to convert her into a static hotel ship to be permanently moored at Hamburg. In early January 2009 the ship was reportedly sold to the scrapyard at Alang, India for € 4.2 million. Despite the sale for scrap the ship remained laid up in Greece and attempts were made to purchase her for hotel ship use. In February 2009 the attempt to save the ship were reported to have failed, and she was beached for scrapping at Alang on 26 February 2009. The ship was broken up in less than seven months after being beached.

== Design ==
=== Exterior ===
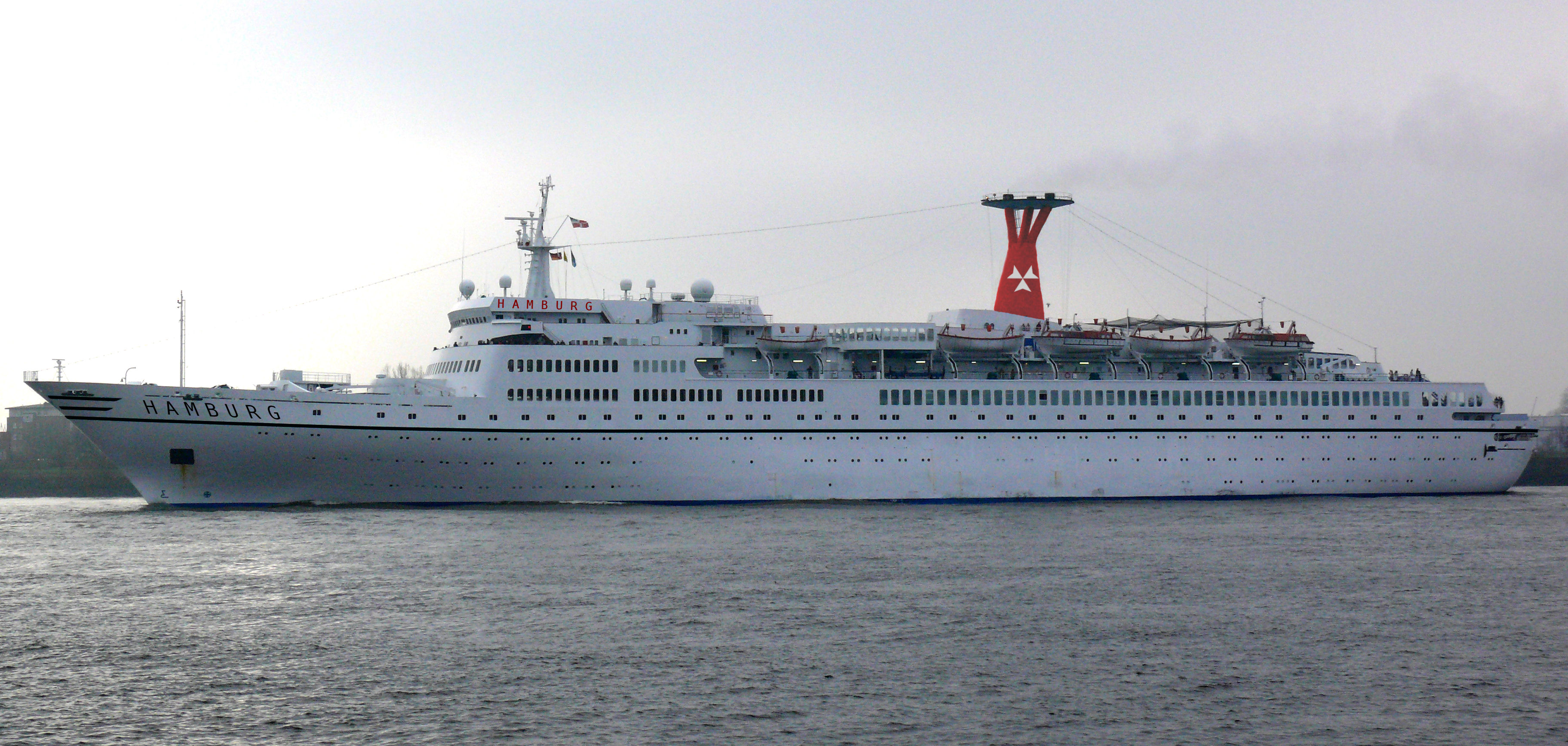
A manipulated photograph showing TS Hamburg in German Atlantic Line colours.

The basic hull design of Hamburg is a conventional, robust steel construction, with entirely flat decks amidship that slope slightly upwards towards the bow in a compromise between modern construction techniques and traditional design values. The superstructure adapted a clear, streamlined design in spirit of the modernism of the late 1960s. With usage as a cruise ships in mind, the ship was built with a mid-ship lido deck complex spanning two decks on the top of the ship. The upper level of the complex was extended all the way to the sides of the ship, allowing a view uninterrupted by lifeboats from the lido to the surrounding sea from behind the shelter provided by high glass screens. In addition to the lido deck, a large sports deck was designed behind the funnel.

Perhaps the most distinctive individual exterior feature of the ship is her slim funnel equipped with a large saucer-like smoke deflector dish on the top, a design that has not been featured on any other ship in such a radical form. The futuristic funnel design in part earned Hamburg the nickname "The Space Ship".

=== Interior ===
The interior layout of Hamburg was based on an axial design, with a central passageway running through the ship on each deck. In order to accomplish this, the funnel uptakes had to be divided. The first notable passenger liner to have featured such a design had been another German ship, SS Vaterland of 1914. Spaciousness was an important factor in interior design, and the feeling of space in the interiors was another reason for the ship's nickname as "The Space Ship".

A major factor in establishing this sense of space was the effectively designed galley, restaurant and crew mess complex located in the forward part of decks 4 and 5. The galley was linked by direct vertical cores to service areas on the upper deck lounges, the whole design minimizing the space required for effective catering of the passengers and crew. This space-effective design also dictated that almost all public rooms are located at the front of the ship (a notable exclusion being the theatre), while all cabins are located on the rear part of the three decks below the promenade deck.

Due to being planned for liner service, Hamburg was designed with spacious cabins, most of which (306 out of 326) feature full bath-tubs, a feature not found on many ships built since. This was required for the potential use as hospital ship, a condition to be fulfilled for the loan back up from German government, if war would break out. It was the Cold War era. The deluxe cabins located on promenade deck, installed after the purchase by Russia, feature floor-to-ceiling windows and separate bedrooms and living rooms.

Most of the public rooms on board the ship were retained in their original use since the ship entered service in 1969, some—such as the Wolga Bar—retaining their original furniture until the very end.

=== Decks ===
As Maxim Gorkiy.

1. Unknown
2. Sauna Deck – spa, swimming pool, sauna
3. Crew spaces
4. Restaurant Deck – restaurants, bar
5. Neptun Deck – restaurant, inside and outside cabins
6. Saturn Deck – information desk, inside and outside cabins
7. Orion Deck – inside and outside cabins
8. Promenade Deck – showroom, library, bars, winter gardens, shops, theatre, enclosed promenade, suites, sun deck
9. Lido Deck – observation lounge, night club / disco, fitness center, chapel, open promenade, swimming pool
10. Sun Deck – cafeteria, sun deck
