= Heritage Adventurer =

Cruise ship

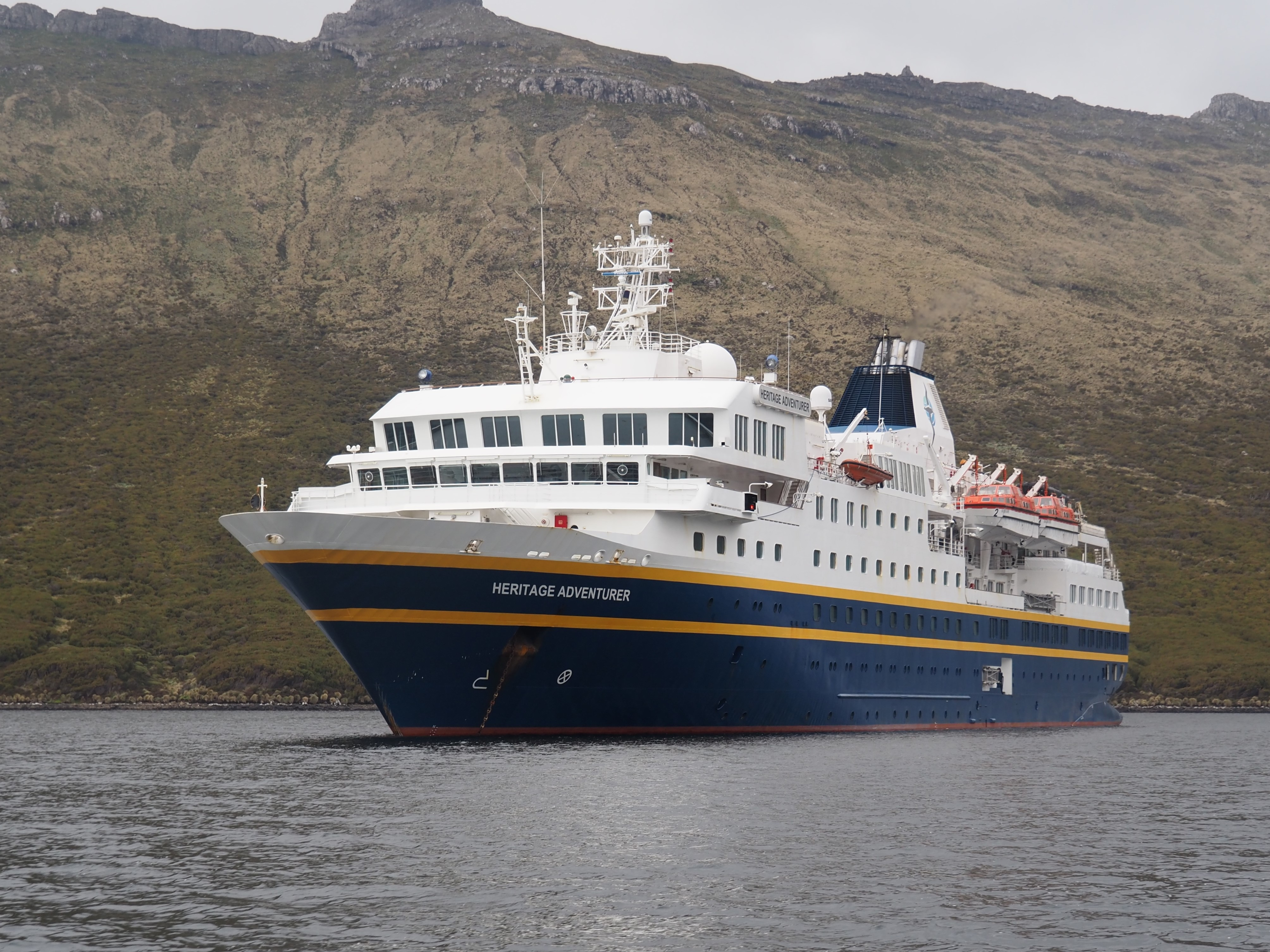
- Heritage Adventurer, in Perseverance Harbour, Campbell Island, New Zealand in 2023

History
- Name: Society Adventurer (1991–1993); Hanseatic (1993–2018); RCGS Resolute (2018–2022); Heritage Adventurer (2022–present)
- Owner: Discoverer Reederei (planned); Society Adventurer Shipping Company (1991–1993); Bunnys Adventure & Cruise Shipping Co (1993–2021); Nordic Heritage Expedition (2021–present)
- Operator: Hanseatic Tours (1993–1997); Hapag-Lloyd Cruises (1997–2018); One Ocean Expeditions (2018–2019); Heritage Expeditions (2021–present)
- Port of registry: (The Bahamas) Nassau, Bahamas (1991–2018); Madeira, Portugal (2018–present)
- Ordered: 22 December 1989
- Builder: Rauma Yards (Rauma, Finland)
- Cost: US$75 million
- Yard number: 306
- Laid down: 3 September 1990
- Launched: 5 January 1991
- Sponsored by: Ursel Klein
- Completed: 7 June 1991
- Maiden voyage: 27 March 1993
- Identification: Call sign: CQAL6; IMO number: 9000168; MMSI number: 255806208; DNV ID: G99209
- Status: In service

General characteristics
- Type: Cruise ship
- Tonnage: 8,445 GT; 2,573 NT; 1,177 DWT
- Displacement: 5,892 tonnes
- Length: 124.8 m (409 ft 5 in)
- Beam: 18.00 m (59 ft 1 in)
- Draft: 4.9 m (16 ft 1 in)
- Depth: 7 m (23 ft 0 in)
- Decks: 6
- Ice class: Germanischer Lloyd E4 (1A Super)
- Installed power: 2 × MaK 8M453C (2 × 2,940 kW)
- Propulsion: Two shafts; controllable pitch propellers
- Speed: 16 knots (30 km/h; 18 mph)
- Range: 8,600 nautical miles (15,900 km; 9,900 mi)
- Capacity: 184 passengers in 88 cabins and four suites
- Crew: 125

Heritage Adventurer is an ice-strengthened expedition cruise ship built in 1991 by Rauma shipyard in Finland. She was originally named Society Adventurer, but after Discoverer Reederei was unable to take delivery of the vessel due to financial troubles, the completed ship was laid up at the shipyard for almost two years. In 1993, she was acquired by Hanseatic Tours (which later merged with Hapag-Lloyd) and renamed Hanseatic. In 2018, she was chartered to One Ocean Expeditions and renamed RCGS Resolute through a partnership with the Royal Canadian Geographical Society. In 2021, she was acquired by Heritage Expeditions and, following an extensive refit, entered service in 2022 with her current name.

== General characteristics ==
Heritage Adventurer is 124.8 metres (409 ft 5 in) long overall and 104.45 metres (342 ft 8 in) between perpendiculars, has a beam of 18 metres (59 ft 1 in) and draws 4.9 metres (16 ft 1 in) of water with a displacement of 5,892 tonnes (5,799 long tons). Her gross tonnage is 8,445; net tonnage 2,573; and deadweight tonnage 1,177 tonnes. The ship's hull and propulsion system are strengthened for navigation in ice-covered waters according to the Germanischer Lloyd ice class notation E4, which is equivalent to the highest Finnish-Swedish ice class for merchant ships, 1A Super.

Originally built to cater to the five-star luxury cruise market, interiors on Heritage Adventurer's six passenger-accessible decks were designed by the German architect Wilfried Köhnemann. The vessel has 88 outside cabins and, above the bridge deck, four suites. The original design capacity was for a total of 184 passengers served by a crew of 125. Public spaces include a restaurant, multiple lounges, and a 78-seat theater. The ship carries 14 Zodiac inflatable boats to take passengers ashore during expedition cruises.

The ship's propulsion system consists of two eight-cylinder MaK 8M453C four-stroke medium-speed diesel engines, each rated 2,940 kilowatts (3,940 hp) at 600 rpm, driving two controllable pitch propellers. Onboard electrical power is generated by two 1,160-kilowatt (1,560 hp) six-cylinder MaK 6M332 auxiliary diesel generators and two 1,040-kilowatt (1,390 hp) main engine driven shaft generators. For maneuvering in ports, the ship has a 700-kilowatt (940 hp) transverse bow thruster. Heritage Adventurer has a service speed of 16 knots (30 km/h; 18 mph) and a cruising range of 8,600 nautical miles (15,900 km; 9,900 mi).

== Career ==
=== Society Adventurer ===
In December 1989, the German cruise ship company Discoverer Reederei ordered a $75 million expedition cruise ship for its United States based subsidiary Society Expeditions. The shipbuilding contract was awarded to Rauma Yards, a new Finnish company established in August of the same year following the disbanding of Rauma-Repola's shipyard group.

Launched on 5 January 1991 as Society Adventurer, was intended for adventure-style cruises to remote destinations such as Antarctica and had, among other features, an ice-strengthened hull. However, Discoverer Reederei was unable to take delivery of the vessel in the following summer due to financial troubles and also had to cancel a sister ship that had already been contracted.

As a result, the ownership of the vessel was transferred to Rauma Yards's newly established Bahamas-registered subsidiary, Society Adventurer Shipping Company, on 7 June 1991. Later that year, Rauma Yards was merged with another local shipbuilder, Hollming, as Finnyards. While on a lay-up at the yard, Society Adventurer was inspected by a number of parties interested in acquiring the vessel, among them Donald Trump who visited Rauma in 1992.

=== Hanseatic ===
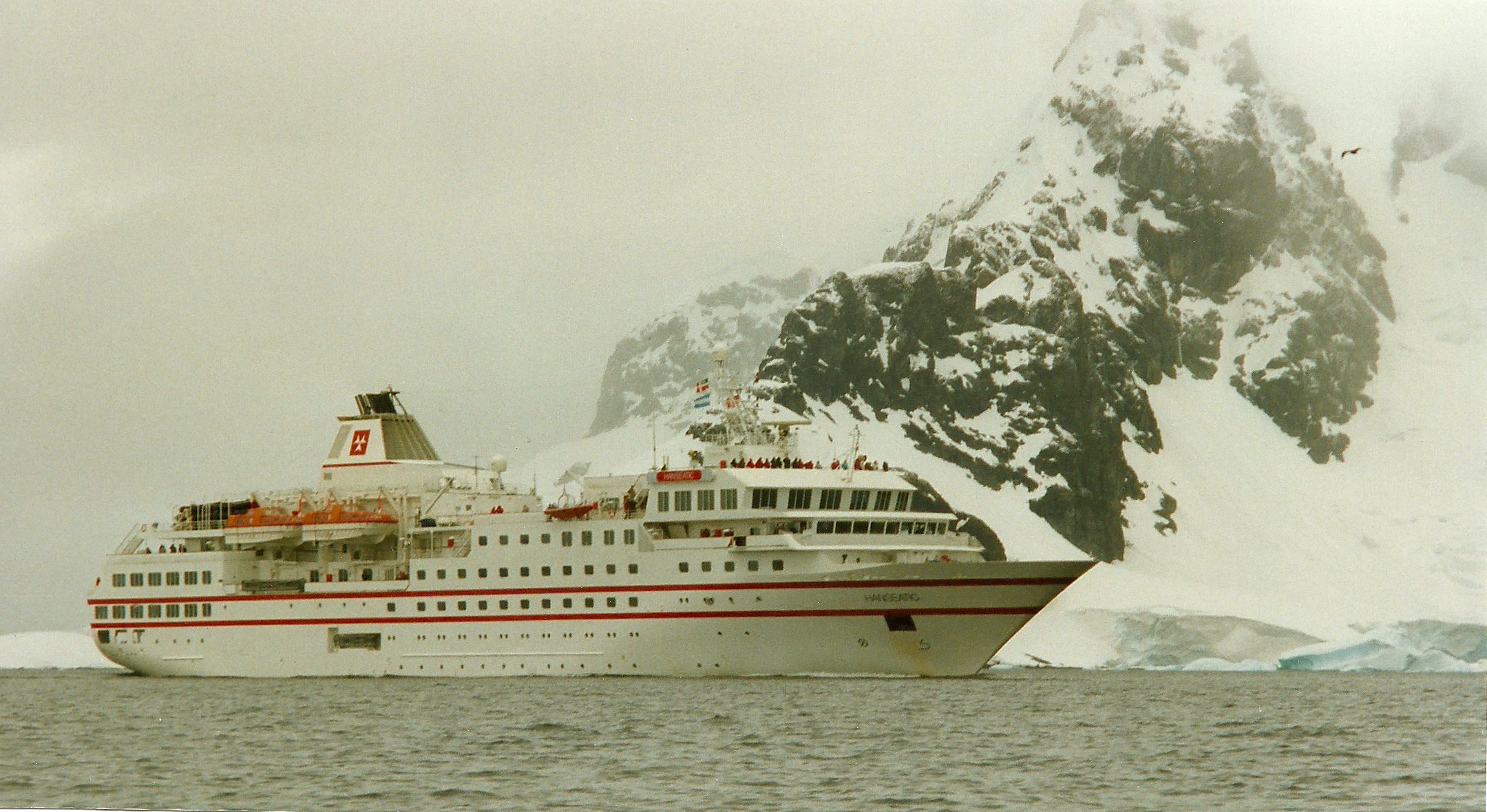
Hanseatic sporting the classic Hamburg Atlantic Line livery in Paradise Harbour, Antarctica in 1994.

In 1993, the ship was chartered and shortly afterwards purchased by the German expedition cruise operator Hanseatic Tours. The company had been established two years earlier by Dirk Moldenhauer, who had been the last captain of German Atlantic Line's cruise ship Hanseatic in 1973 and later acquired rights to the classic Hamburg Atlantic Line logo, livery and the name "Hanseatic". Society Adventurer was renamed Hanseatic on 23 March 1993, becoming the fourth ship to bear the name, and the original blue-yellow-white Discoverer Reederei livery was replaced with the white hull and red decorative stripes. The vessel's maiden cruise from Hamburg to Sevilla began on 27 March 1993.

When Hanseatic Tours merged with Hapag-Lloyd in 1997, Hanseatic retained her original name as well as Hamburg Atlantic Line livery and funnel logo until rebranding in 2011.

Hanseatic remained in Hapag-Lloyd's fleet until 2018. Over the ship's 25-year career and a total of 667 cruises, she made 128 expeditions to Antarctica, two voyages to the Northern Sea Route (Northeast Passage), and transited the full length of the Northwest Passage 11 times. The latter is a record number for passenger ships, exceeded only by the Russian icebreaker Kapitan Khlebnikov which is also used for expedition cruises. Hanseatic also holds the record for having been further north among passenger-carrying ships that are not icebreakers: on 26 August 2014, the vessel reached 85°40.7′N 135°39.6′E, 259 nautical miles (480 km; 298 mi) from the North Pole, due to unusually easy ice conditions in the Russian Arctic at that time.

=== RCGS Resolute ===
In June 2017, the Canada-based cruise ship operator One Ocean Expeditions announced that it would expand its fleet of expedition cruise ships with a long-term charter of the former Hanseatic.

The ship would be renamed RCGS Resolute after the 1850-built Royal Navy Arctic exploration vessel HMS Resolute as well as the Inuit hamlet Resolute, Nunavut. Furthermore, the ship would carry the initials of the Royal Canadian Geographical Society (RCGS) with whom One Ocean Expeditions had partnered. After concluding her career with Hapag-Lloyd, the vessel was drydocked at Blohm+Voss shipyard in Hamburg, Germany where a so-called duck tail sponson was added to the stern. In October 2018, she headed to Canada under her new name and a Portuguese flag, and with a new livery.

In 2019, the company's financial difficulties began to surface with the sudden withdrawal of the Russian research vessels Akademik Ioffe and Akademik Sergey Vavilov chartered from the Shirshov Institute of Oceanology. Although One Ocean Expeditions initially called the Russian owner's action a contract violation, it was later revealed that the company had failed to pay charter and fueling fees to the intermediate charterer Terragelida Ship Management which had then terminated the contract. This left One Ocean Expeditions with just one ship, RCGS Resolute. In August, she was briefly arrested in Iqaluit over a C$100,000 payment dispute. While this issue was reportedly solved quickly, another arrest over non-payment of services and crew wages followed in Halifax next month. Finally, in October One Ocean Expeditions was forced to cancel an Antarctic cruise midway after the vessel could not be refueled due to the company's non-payment of outstanding debts. Shortly after the ship's 140 passengers disembarked, RCGS Resolute was detained in Buenos Aires over "significant debt". The company entered administration in January 2020.

On 5 March 2020, RCGS Resolute left Buenos Aires after the ship's registered owner, Bunnys Adventure & Cruise Shipping Company Limited, paid a total of US$3.6 million of One Ocean Expeditions's outstanding debt to fuel suppliers, ship agents and crew members in order to avoid a court-ordered sale of the vessel. However, in June 2020 it was reported that RCGS Resolute would be sold in an auction in Curaçao to cover the shipowner's nearly $4 million debt. The ship was reportedly sold for $600,000 on 22 June 2020.

=== Heritage Adventurer ===
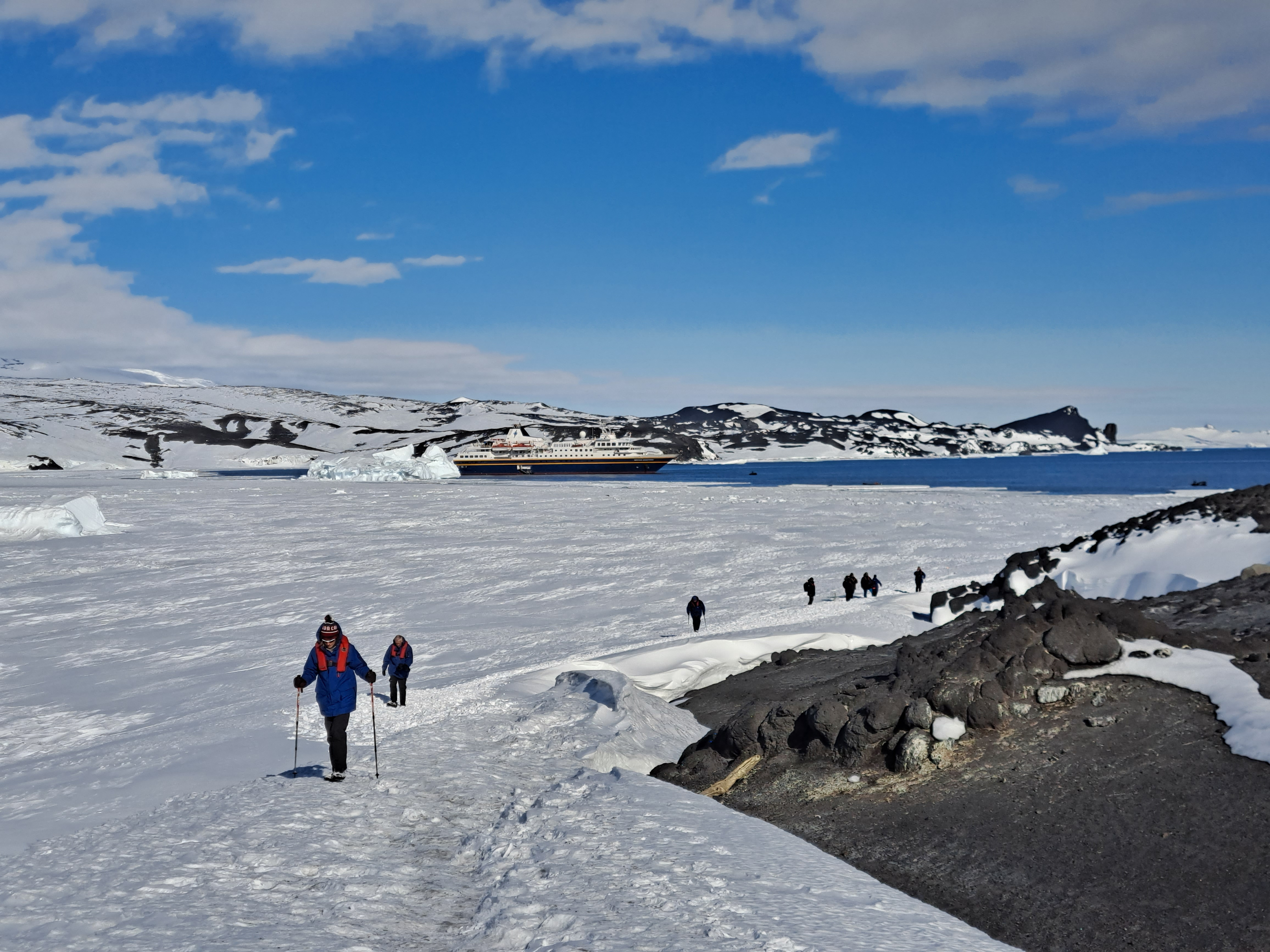
Heritage Adventurer seen from route to Shackleton's Hut at Cape Royds

In 2021, Heritage Expeditions, an expedition cruise company based in Christchurch, New Zealand, announced that it had acquired the ship on long-term contract. An extensive refit of the vessel was undertaken in Greece and Turkey. During the refit, the passenger accommodation was reduced from 184 to 140. Heritage Expeditions said that this was to provide a more comfortable and spacious experience on board. The hull was painted blue with gold bands, and the vessel was renamed Heritage Adventurer. It began cruises for Heritage Expeditions in October 2022.

In September 2025, the first stage of a programme of refurbishment work was carried out on the guest accommodation on decks 5 and 6, and in the dining room and bistro. Stages 2 and 3 covering the rest of the guest accommodation and other shared areas will take place in 2026 and 2027.

== Incidents ==
=== 1996 grounding ===
On 29 August 1996, Hanseatic ran aground in Simpson Strait in the Canadian Arctic. The vessel was eleven days into an eastbound transit along the Northwest Passage with 149 passengers and 110 crew, and had stopped at Gjoa Haven to let passengers ashore. Unknowingly to the crew, a green buoy marking a shallow shoal had not been removed after the previous navigating season and, over the winter months, had been moved to the northeast by about 200 metres (220 yd) by drifting ice. Shortly after departure, Hanseatic ran aground on the shoal at 68°33.75′N 97°32.2′W.

With no danger of the vessel sinking, Hanseatic's passengers were allowed to explore the nearby islands using the ship's boats until the Russian icebreaker Kapitan Dranitsyn arrived to pick up the passengers on 5 September and continue the Northwest Passage expedition under charter by Hanseatic Tours. Hanseatic itself was successfully refloated on 8 September. While the ship's hull was damaged during the grounding, no oil spilled to the sea and there were no injuries among the passengers or the crew.

=== 1997 grounding ===
On 14 July 1997, Hanseatic was grounded on a sand bank in Murchisonfjorden in Svalbard with 145 passengers on board. No injuries nor damage to the ship was reported, and the passengers were again taken to explore nearby islands on Hanseatic's Zodiac boats while awaiting evacuation. By 17 July, the ship had been refloated and was heading towards Longyearbyen for inspection.

=== 2005 grounding ===
In August 2005, Hanseatic ran aground near the island of Lurøya on the Norwegian coast, just south of the Arctic Circle, with 160 passengers on board. While the vessel was not in danger of sinking despite a 5-metre (16 ft) hole in one of her ballast water tank, the passengers and part of the crew were nonetheless evacuated.

=== 2013 drydock fire ===
On 13 June 2013, a fire broke out in Hanseatic's engine room due to hot work in one of the ballast water tanks while the ship was in a drydock at the Bredo Shipyard in Bremerhaven. Due to delays in drydocking and additional repairs required by the fire, four cruises between 17 June and 1 August had to be cancelled.

=== 2020 collision ===
On 30 March 2020, RCGS Resolute was involved in an incident in international waters off the Venezuelan coast which led to the sinking of the Venezuelan Coast Guard patrol boat Naiguatá (GC-23) following a collision with the cruise ship. RCGS Resolute suffered only minor damage. Because the cruise ship was a Portuguese−flagged vessel, an investigation was conducted by the Office for the Investigation of Maritime Accidents and the Aeronautical Meteorology Authority (Gabinete de Investigação de Acidentes Marítimos e da Autoridade para a Meteorologia Aeronáutica or GAMA) of Portugal. The investigation report discussed the possibility that the unexpected change in Naiguatá's heading just before the collision, as reported by RCGS Resolute, may have been caused by a suction effect between the vessels as the faster patrol boat passed the bow of the cruise ship. Although the collision may have not been intentional ramming, the conclusion was nonetheless that the incident that led to the sinking of Naiguatá was the result of a deliberate act initiated by the Venezuelan Navy rather than an accidental occurrence.
