= Hapag-Lloyd Cruises =

German cruise line

- Type: Joint venture
- Industry: Transportation
- Founded: 1970
- Headquarters: Hamburg, Germany
- Key people: Julian Pfitzner
- Products: Cruise ship holidays
- Parent: TUI Cruises (50%); Royal Caribbean (50%)
- Website: www.hl-cruises.com

Hapag-Lloyd Cruises is a German cruise line that operates smaller luxury ships on worldwide itineraries, along with three expeditions ships.

== History ==
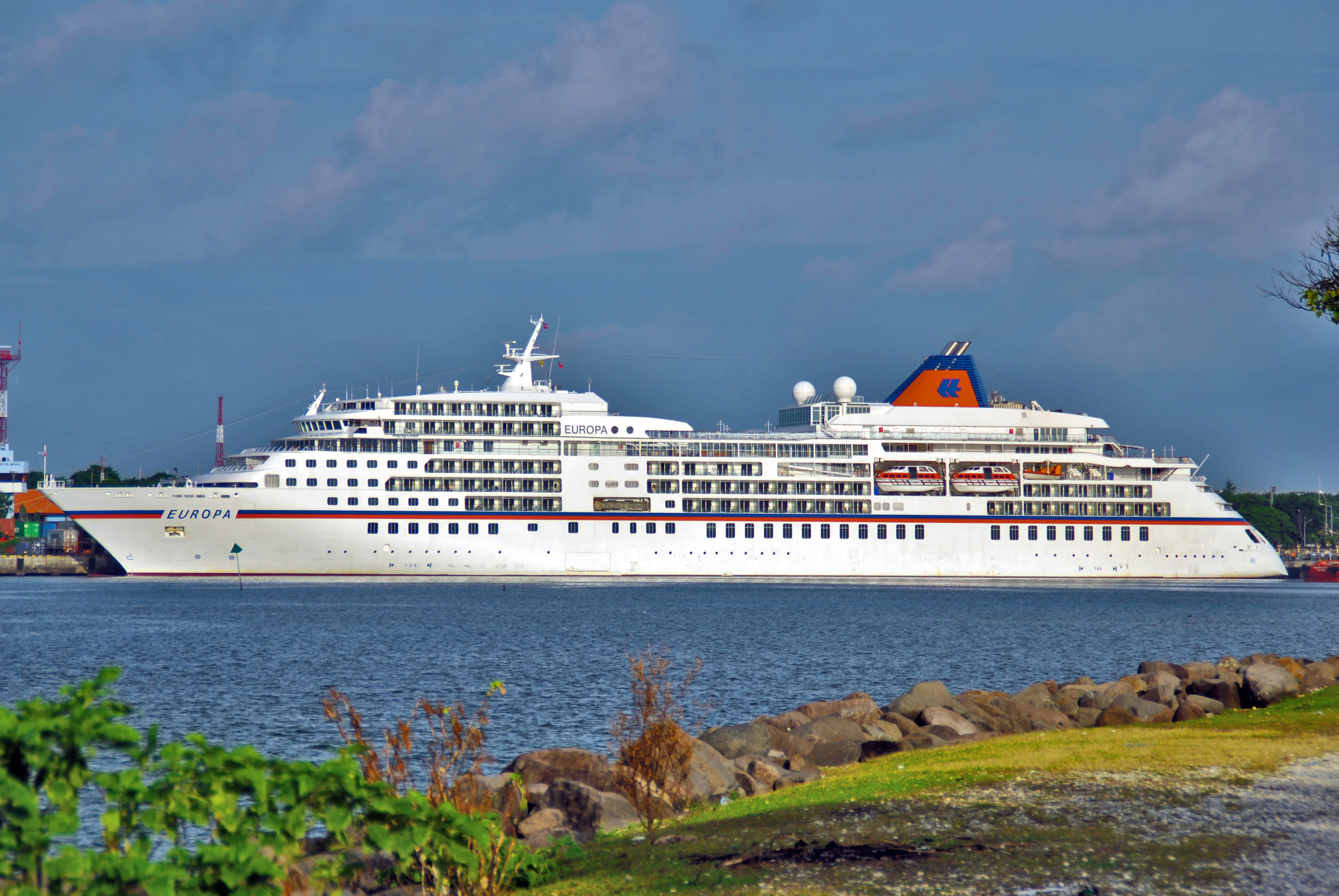
Europa

On September 1, 1970, Hapag-Lloyd was formed by the merger of two German transportation/maritime companies, Hamburg-American Line (HAPAG), which dated from 1847, and Norddeutscher Lloyd (known in English as North German Lloyd), which was formed in 1857. Hapag had withdrawn from passenger service in 1960, while Norddeutscher Lloyd was operating the Bremen and Europa. The merged line adopted the orange and blue funnel and new logo still used on these ships today. The new lines first purpose built ship was the Europa, built in 1981.

Hapag-Lloyd Kreuzfahrten operated as a subsidiary of Hapag-Lloyd AG in 2008. In 2008, TUI AG integrated Hapag-Lloyd Kreuzfahrten. It was renamed Hapag-Lloyd Cruises in 2016. In 2020, Hapag-Lloyd Kreuzfahrten was sold to TUI Cruises, a joint venture between TUI and Royal Caribbean.

== Fleet ==
=== Current fleet ===
Name	Image	Built	In service for HAPAG-LLOYD Cruises	Tonnage	Yard Built
Europa		1999	1999–Present	28,890 GT	Kvaerner Masa-Yards Hietalahti shipyard, Helsinki, Finland
Europa 2		2013	2013–present	42,830 GT	Chantiers de l'Atlantique, France
Hanseatic Inspiration		2019	2019–present	15,540 GT	Vard Shipyard, Romania
Hanseatic Nature		2019	2019–present	15,540 GT	Vard Shipyard, Romania
Hanseatic Spirit		2021	2021–present	15,540 GT	Vard Shipyard, Romania

=== Former Fleet ===
Name	Image	Built	Tonnage	In service for HAPAG-LLOYD Cruises
Bremen		1938	32,360 GRT	1970–1971
Europa		1952	21,164 GRT	1970–1981
Finnstar		1967	8,583 GRT	1979–1980
Europa		1981	37,049 GT	1981–1999
Bremen		1990	6,752 GT	1993–2021
Hanseatic		1993	8,445 GT	1996–2018
Columbus		1997	15,067 GT	1997–2012
Columbus 2		1998	30,277 GT	2012–2014
