= RMS Empress of Japan (1929) =

Canadian (later German) ocean liner

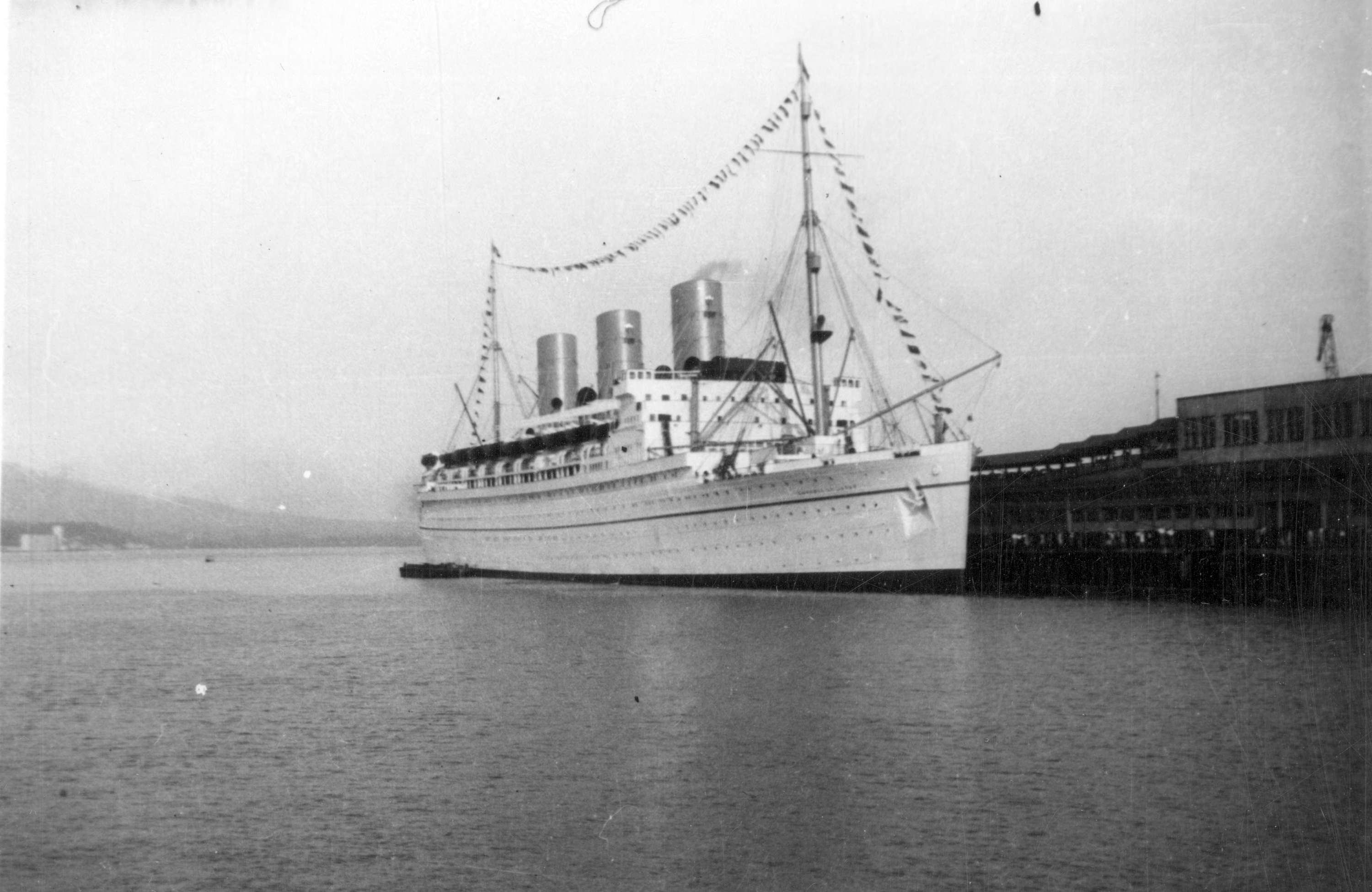
- Empress of Japan

History
- Name: 1930–1942: RMS Empress of Japan; 1942–1957: RMS Empress of Scotland; 1957–1966: TS Hanseatic
- Owner: 1930–1957: Canadian Pacific Line; 1957–1966: Hamburg Atlantic Line
- Operator: 1930–1957: Canadian Pacific Line; 1957–1958: rebuilt; 1958–1966: Hamburg Atlantic Line
- Port of registry: 1930–1957: London, United Kingdom; 1957–1966: Hamburg, West Germany
- Builder: Fairfield Shipbuilding & Engineering Company, Govan
- Yard number: 634
- Launched: 17 December 1929
- Completed: June 1930
- In service: 1930
- Out of service: 1966
- Identification: Official Number: 161430
- Fate: Destroyed by fire at New York City harbour, 7 September 1966. Subsequently scrapped in Hamburg

General characteristics (as Empress of Scotland)
- Type: Ocean liner/cruise ship
- Tonnage: 26,300 GRT
- Length: 205 m (673 ft)
- Beam: 25.5 m (84 ft)
- Speed: 22 kn (41 km/h; 25 mph)
- Capacity: 1,260 (liner service); 960 (cruise service)

General characteristics (as Hanseatic)
- Type: Ocean liner/cruise ship
- Tonnage: 30,030 GRT
- Length: 205 m (673 ft)
- Beam: 25.5 m (84 ft)
- Speed: 22 kn (41 km/h; 25 mph)
- Capacity: 1,260 (liner service); 960 (cruise service)

RMS Empress of Japan was an ocean liner built in 1929–1930 by Fairfield Shipbuilding & Engineering Company at Govan on the Clyde in Scotland for Canadian Pacific Steamships (CP). This ship was the second of two CP vessels to be named Empress of Japan – regularly traversed the trans-Pacific route between the west coast of Canada and the Far East until 1942.

In 1942, she was renamed RMS Empress of Scotland – the second of two CP vessels to be named Empress of Scotland. In 1957, the Hamburg Atlantic Line purchased the ship and re-named her TS Hanseatic.

== Concept and construction ==
By the 1920s the Canadian Pacific conglomerate had established a sea/rail connection between Europe and the Far East. The company's steamships would carry passengers from Great Britain to Canada, the same company's railroad carried passengers across the North American continent to Vancouver, where passengers boarded another Canadian Pacific ship that would carry them across the Pacific to Asia. This was at the time the fastest way to reach the Far East from Europe. In the late 1920s Canadian Pacific decided to modernize their Pacific and Atlantic fleets, with the aim of reducing the journey time between Europe and the Far East by two days.

The new liner intended for the transpacific service was envisioned at approximately 25,000 gross register tons, 203.05 m (666 ft 2 in) in length and capable of carrying 1173 passengers in four classes. Construction of the vessel was awarded to Fairfield Shipbuilding & Engineering Company at Govan near Glasgow in Scotland. She was launched on 17 December 1929 and named Empress of Japan. Originally Canadian Pacific had planned on constructing a sister ship for her for the Pacific service, but due to the Great Depression the second ship was left unrealized. Instead, the company decided to concentrate their resources on Empress of Britain, a larger version of Empress of Japan under construction for their trans-Atlantic service. Empress of Britain was approximately 16,000 GRT larger than Empress of Japan.

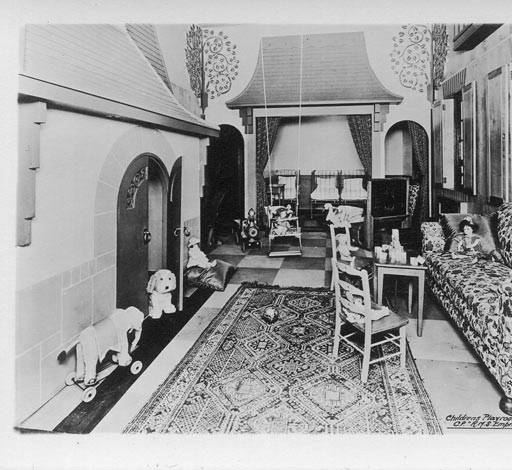
1st class children's playroom of Empress of Japan

== Service history ==
=== 1930–1942: Empress of Japan ===
Empress of Japan carried out her sea trial successfully in May 1930, achieving a top speed of 23 kn (43 km/h; 26 mph); and on 8 June 1930, she was delivered to Vancouver for service on the trans-Pacific route. In this period, she was the fastest ocean liner on the Pacific, able to complete a one-way crossing in just nine days.

She would continue sailing the Vancouver – Yokohama – Kobe – Shanghai – Hong Kong route for the rest of the decade. Amongst her celebrity passengers were a number of American baseball all-stars, including Babe Ruth, who sailed to Japan for a barnstorming tour in October 1934.

Spiritual Master Meher Baba sailed from California for China, via Honolulu in 1932

The outbreak of war in Europe caused Empress of Japan to be re-fitted for wartime service.

Empress of Scotland with her decks filled with fighting men. This in-port photograph allows a close view of the ship's construction when ship still had three funnels, circa 1940s.

Following the Japanese attacks on the Empire outposts in the Far East in December 1941, the Empress of Japan was the last ship to successfully evacuate civilians from Singapore, leaving the dock on 30 January 1942 and arriving in Durban about 10 days later. Later in the same year, she was renamed Empress of Scotland.

=== 1948–1957: Empress of Scotland ===
Following the end of World War II, Empress of Scotland was needed to meet the newly developing demands for trans-Atlantic passenger service. In the period between 1948 and 1950, she was rebuilt at Fairfield in Glasgow. These modifications were necessary to better meet weather conditions on the colder Atlantic route. This extensive re-fitting included a radical reconfiguration of her cabins from the original four classes to just two – first and tourist. In 1951 she carried Princess Elizabeth (later Queen Elizabeth II) and Prince Philip, Duke of Edinburgh returning from their tour of Canada. They departed from St John's Canada and travelled to Liverpool. The Canadian Pacific Empress of Scotland completed her last trans-Atlantic crossing in 1957; and she was temporarily laid up in Belfast until being sold.

=== 1958–1966: Hanseatic ===
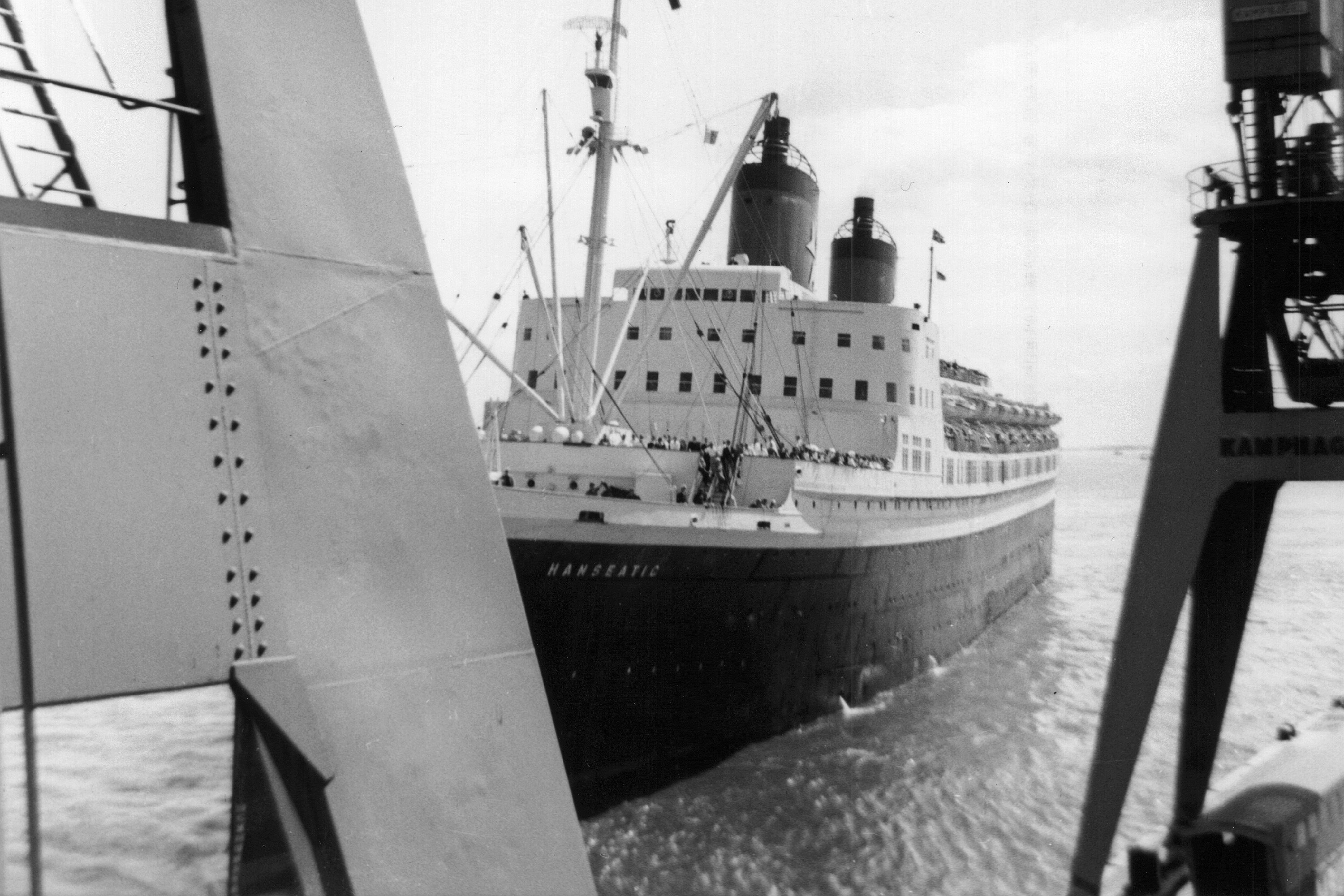
Hanseatic landing the port of Cuxhaven at Steubenhoeft in summer 1961

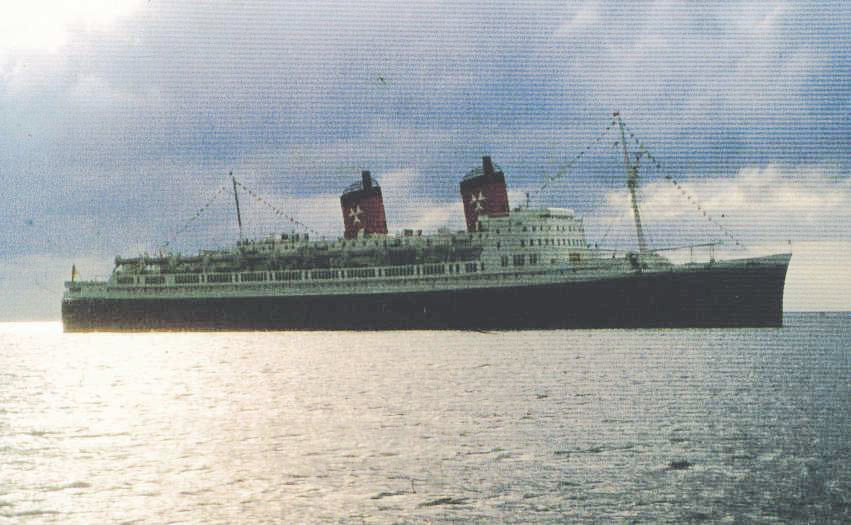
TS Hanseatic at sea

Following her sale to Hamburg Atlantic Line in 1958, the ship was radically rebuilt to meet the expanding market for trans-Atlantic passenger service. The ship's rear funnel was removed, her remaining funnels and superstructure were rebuilt and her passenger accommodation was re-configured. The vessel emerged as the 30,030 GRT TS Hanseatic. The renamed and re-flagged ship was designed to carry as many 1,350 passengers in comfortable luxury on the Hamburg-New York route. On 8 September 1966, the ship caught fire at New York. The fire developed in the engine room and gutted five decks. On 28 September, the ship was towed to Hamburg, West Germany for inspection. Deemed beyond economic repair, she was scrapped shortly thereafter.

== See also ==
- Samuel Robinson, first captain (1930–1932)
