= List of shipwrecks in 2020 =

The list of shipwrecks in 2020 includes ships sunk, foundered, grounded, or otherwise lost during 2020.

table of contents
2020
Jan	Feb	Mar	Apr
May	Jun	Jul	Aug
Sep	Oct	Nov	Dec
Unknown date

== January ==
=== 4 January ===
List of shipwrecks: 4 January 2020
Ship	State	Description
Unidentified boat	United States Coast Guard	A 26-foot (7.9 m) trailerable Aids to Navigation Boat capsized when a heavy wake struck her as she approached Pier 39 in Astoria, Oregon. The Columbia River bar pilot vessel Connor Foss (United States) rescued her entire crew of four.

=== 7 January ===
List of shipwrecks: 7 January 2020
Ship	State	Description
Papa's Girl	United States	The shrimp boat capsized and sank in a storm in Pamlico Sound. Three people were killed, with one survivor.

=== 10 January ===
List of shipwrecks: 10 January 2020
Ship	State	Description
Dursun Ali Coskun	Turkey	The fishing vessel was sunk in a collision with the tanker Glard-2 (Russia) in the Black Sea north of Kilyos, Turkey. Three crew were rescued, three were reported missing.
Express 88	Indonesia	The tanker dragged anchor in a storm and was beached on the north coast of Bawean Island in the Java Sea. Her 11 crew were rescued.

=== 11 January ===
List of shipwrecks: 11 January 2020
Ship	State	Description
KM EL No. 2	Indonesia	The cargo ship sank in rough seas due to cargo shift in the Java Sea off Belitung Island in shallow water with part of her superstructure above water. Her 14 crew were rescued.

=== 14 January ===
List of shipwrecks: 14 January 2020
Ship	State	Description
Pappy's Pride	United States	The fishing vessel capsized in a collision in fog with the tanker Bow Fortune (Norway) in the Gulf of Mexico off Galveston, Texas. Two people were rescued by another vessel and the United States Coast Guard, but one of them died. Two people were reported missing.

=== 17 January ===
List of shipwrecks: 17 January 2020
Ship	State	Description
Rawan	Tanzania	The tanker dragged her anchor in stormy weather and went aground near Famagusta, Cyprus. The crew was unharmed.

=== 21 January ===
List of shipwrecks: 21 January 2020
Ship	State	Description
CE-13	Hong Kong	The customs boat capsized in a collision with a smuggling vessel near Chek Lap Kok Island, north of Lantau Island, Hong Kong. Three crewmen were trapped in the cabin. They were rescued alive by divers, but died at the hospital. Two crewmen on deck survived.
Everett Fisher	United States	The dredger barge sprung a leak and was grounded to prevent sinking by her tug Dana Robyn (United States) in the Matagorda Ship Channel near Port Lavaca, Texas. The crew were rescued by Dana Robyn.

=== 24 January ===
List of shipwrecks: 24 January 2020
Ship	State	Description
Reem 5	Panama	The tanker sprung a leak and was abandoned in the Arabian Sea 185 nautical miles (343 km; 213 mi) south west of Karachi, Pakistan, and later sank. All 13 crew were picked up by a cargo ship in the area.

=== 26 January ===
List of shipwrecks: 26 January 2020
Ship	State	Description
RC Kreppel	United States	While pushing two barges carrying sulfuric acid, the towing vessel sank after colliding with the towing vessel Cooperative Spirit (United States) on the Mississippi River in the vicinity of Mile Marker 123 near Luling, Louisiana. One of the barges suffered damage and leaked toxic vapor into the air. One member of RC Kreppel's crew was rescued from the water; the other three were reported missing.

=== 27 January ===
List of shipwrecks: 27 January 2020
Ship	State	Description
Unidentified boats	United States	Thirty-five small boats, houseboats, and pontoon boats were destroyed in a pre-dawn fire that swept across a dock at a marina on the Tennessee River in Scottsboro, Alabama. Some of the boats sank at their moorings, while others drifted into the river before sinking. Eight people were confirmed dead.

== February ==
=== 3 February ===
List of shipwrecks: 3 February 2020
Ship	State	Description
Graha Angkasa 1	Indonesia	The cargo ship flooded and sank in challenging weather off North Sulawesi, Indonesia. Her 12 crew were rescued.

=== 10 February ===
List of shipwrecks: 10 February 2020
Ship	State	Description
Unidentified sailboat	Sweden	With two people aboard, a sailboat capsized on Fegen, a lake in southern Sweden, during a storm. One man on board washed ashore and subsequently died, and the other occupant was reported missing.

=== 11 February ===
List of shipwrecks: 11 February 2020
Ship	State	Description
Unidentified boat	Unknown	A small wooden boat with perhaps as many as 130 Rohingya refugees fleeing the Rohingya conflict and genocide in Myanmar and attempting to reach refugee camps in Bangladesh sank in the predawn hours in the Bay of Bengal southeast of Bangladesh near St. Martin's Island. The bodies of 15 people—11 women and 4 children—were recovered and 69 people were rescued.

=== 15 February ===
List of shipwrecks: 15 February 2020
Ship	State	Description
Albacore Seis	Netherlands Antilles	The tuna purse seiner flooded and sank south of Abidjan, Ivory Coast. All 29 crew were rescued by the motor vessel Montelape (Netherlands Antilles).

=== 17 February ===
List of shipwrecks: 17 February 2020
Ship	State	Description
Shenzhou 19	China	The cargo ship sank north of Zhoushan, China. Three crew members were rescued but died of hypothermia. Three were reported missing.

=== 24 February ===
List of shipwrecks: 24 February 2020
Ship	State	Description
Stellar Banner	Marshall Islands	The ore carrier suffered bow damage while leaving the terminal at Sao Luis, Brazil, developed a heavy list, and was run aground off Maranhão, Brazil, to prevent her from sinking. Declared a constructive total loss, she was scuttled 90 nautical miles (170 km) off the coast of Brazil on 12 June.

=== 27 February ===
List of shipwrecks: 27 February 2020
Ship	State	Description
Clavigo	Antigua and Barbuda	The cargo ship dragged her anchor in bad weather, became entangled with the cargo ship Dede (Togo), and went aground in the Sea of Marmara at Tuzla, Istanbul, Turkey.
Dede	Togo	The cargo ship was seriously damaged when she became entangled with the cargo ship Clavico (Antigua and Barbuda) when Clavigo dragged her anchor in bad weather, then went aground in the Sea of Marmara at Tuzla, Istanbul, Turkey, with a list and became partially submerged.

=== 29 February ===
List of shipwrecks: 29 February 2020
Ship	State	Description
Anna Karoline III	Brazil	With 60 passengers aboard, the river passenger ship sank in the Amazon River near the mouth of the Jari River. 46 people were rescued, 13 were killed, and 1 was reported missing.
Guo Xing 1	Japan	The cargo ship sank in a collision with a fishing boat in the Pacific Ocean off Honshu, Japan. Thirteen of her 14 crew members were reported missing.

== March ==
=== 5 March ===
List of shipwrecks: 5 March 2020
Ship	State	Description
Duc Minh 555	Vietnam	The cargo ship went ashore in rough weather with strong winds and high seas in the Gulf of Tonkin (18°12′N 106°16′E) and was partially sunk with waves battering her.

=== 9 March ===
List of shipwrecks: 9 March 2020
Ship	State	Description
Unidentified pilot boat	Taiwan	A pilot boat was sunk in a collision with Godspeed (Hong Kong) at Taipei, Taiwan. One crewman died, the other, her captain, was reported missing.

=== 12 March ===
List of shipwrecks: 12 March 2020
Ship	State	Description
Duban	Togo	The cargo ship sprung a leak and sank 13 nautical miles (24 km) off the coast of Oaxaca, Mexico in the Pacific Ocean. All 12 crew rescued.
Mamamoyee Maa	Bangladesh	The coastal lighter was damaged in a collision with an unknown Kolkata Port Trust ship at Kolkata, India. An attempt to beach her to prevent sinking failed when the current swept her off the bank and she sank in the Hooghly River.

=== 14 March ===
List of shipwrecks: 9 March 2020
Ship	State	Description
Ajanta	India	The ferry sank and capsized after she hit a rock whilst en route from Mumbai to Maharashtra, India. All 88 passengers were rescued by civilian boats.
Capt. Berto II	Honduras	The ro-ro ferry sank 40 miles (64 km) off Coxen Hole, Roatán, Honduras, in the Caribbean Sea. Six crew were rescued, two others were reported missing.
Jing Wei 188	China	The cargo ship sank in the southern Taiwan Straits south of Xiamen, China. Ten crew were rescued, three were reported missing.

=== 17 March ===
List of shipwrecks: xx January 2020
Ship	State	Description
Nourah of Riyad	Cayman Islands	The superyacht capsized at Athens, Greece.

=== 20 March ===
List of shipwrecks: 20 March 2020
Ship	State	Description
KM Surya Express	Indonesia	The cargo ship sank off north east coast of Papua New Guinea (00°40′S 133°20′E). 17 crew were rescued, 1 other was reported missing.

=== 25 March ===
List of shipwrecks: 25 March 2020
Ship	State	Description
Lady Sandra	United Kingdom	The British-flagged tanker split into two off the southeast coast of Malta after taking on water in bad weather. Three crew were rescued by the Maritime Squadron of the Armed Forces of Malta search and rescue launch Melita I.

=== 28 March ===
List of shipwrecks: 28 March 2020
Ship	State	Description
Aqua Sprinter II	Germany	The barge split in two and sank at dock in Dillingen, Saarland, Germany.

=== 29 March ===
List of shipwrecks: 29 March 2020
Ship	State	Description
Xinda 9	China	The cargo ship sank in a collision with fishing vessel Zhepuyu 34197 (China) in the East China Sea in Zhoushan waters south of Shanghai, China. All crew were rescued.

=== 30 March ===
List of shipwrecks: 30 March 2020
Ship	State	Description
Naiguatá	Bolivarian Navy of Venezuela	The Guaicamacuto-class patrol boat sank after ramming the cruise ship RCGS Resolute (Madeira) northwest of La Tortuga Island, Venezuela, in the Caribbean Sea. All crew were rescued.

=== 31 March ===
List of shipwrecks: 31 March 2020
Ship	State	Description
Jianghaiyanghongwei	China	The cargo ship sank 50 nautical miles (93 km; 58 mi) southeast of Pingtan with five crew members aboard. All five crew members were rescued by the search and rescue ship Dong Hai Jiu 116 (China).

== April ==
=== 2 April ===
List of shipwrecks: 2 April 2020
Ship	State	Description
QNg 90617 TS	Vietnam	The fishing vessel sank in the South China Sea near the Paracel Islands after colliding with an unidentified China Coast Guard patrol vessel. The patrol vessel rescued the fishing vessel's entire crew of eight. Vietnam claimed the Chinese vessel rammed the fishing vessel, while the People's Republic of China claimed that the fishing vessel made unsafe maneuvers that caused it to collide with the Chinese vessel.

=== 3 April ===
List of shipwrecks: 3 April 2020
Ship	State	Description
Sri-nopparat 11	Thailand	The fishing vessel was split in two and sunk in a collision with the tanker Sun Flora (Panama) in the Gulf of Siam south of Sattahip. All eight crew were rescued by other fishing vessels.
Taimareho	Solomon Islands	Cyclone Harold: The ferry sank in during a tropical cyclone, possibly after being struck by a huge wave, in the Solomon Islands between Honiara and Malaita. Twenty-eight people were reported missing.

=== 10 April ===
List of shipwrecks: 10 April 2020
Ship	State	Description
PY 40087 TS	Vietnam	The fishing vessel sank in the South China Sea off Qui Nhơn, Vietnam after colliding with Pacific Express (Vietnam). The crew of three were rescued by other fishing boats.
Rupanti	Bangladesh	The lighter struck a high-voltage power line tower and sank in the Hooghly River near the village of Namkhana, West Bengal, India. The crew was rescued.

=== 26 April ===
List of shipwrecks: 26 April 2020
Ship	State	Description
Tuan Tu 08	Vietnam	The cargo ship filled and sank in the harbor at Vĩnh Tân, Vietnam.

=== 27 April ===
List of shipwrecks: 27 April 2020
Ship	State	Description
PNS Tippu Sultan	Pakistan Navy	The decommissioned Tariq-class frigate was sunk as a target in the northern Arabian Sea by a missile.

== May ==
=== 1 May ===
List of shipwrecks: 1 May 2020
Ship	State	Description
BTh 89719	Vietnam	The fishing vessel sank in the South China Sea 13 nautical miles (24 km) off La Gi, Vietnam, after colliding with White Tomony (The Philippines). The crew of six was rescued by other fishing boats.

=== 2 May ===
List of shipwrecks: 2 May 2020
Ship	State	Description
Unidentified fishing boat	United States	A 22-foot (6.7 m) or 27-foot (8.2 m) — sources disagree — fishing boat capsized and threw her four occupants into the water in Reynolds Channel off Long Island, New York, near Point Lookout when several large waves struck her. Her captain died, and another man was reported missing. The other two men on board were rescued by a passing 68-foot (20.7 m) boat and survived.

=== 4 May ===
List of shipwrecks: 4 May 2020
Ship	State	Description
Irma Dulce	Unflagged	The incomplete tanker sprang a leak and sank overnight in the Maua shipyard, Rio de Janeiro, Brazil.

=== 10 May ===
List of shipwrecks: 10 May 2020
Ship	State	Description
Konarak	Islamic Republic of Iran Navy	The support vessel was struck by a missile fired from the frigate Jamaran ( Islamic Republic of Iran Navy) in the Gulf of Oman. Nineteen of her crew were killed.
Samudra Sakti I	Indonesia	The bulk carrier was damaged in a collision with Shahraz (Iran) in the Singapore Strait south of Saint John's Island and beached. The vessel was refloated on 12 May and anchored at Batam, Indonesia.
Shahraz	Iran	The container ship was damaged in a collision with Samudra Sakti I (Indonesia) in the Singapore Strait south of Saint John's Island and was beached with hull damage. The hull appeared to be cracked on both sides, possibly split in two. Shahraz remained aground near Batam, Indonesia, for at least six months, when she was struck by a passing ship on 23 November 2020.

=== 30 May ===
List of shipwrecks: 30 May 2020
Ship	State	Description
Lian Hang 7	China	The cargo ship sank in shallow water the East China Sea 10 nautical miles (19 km; 12 mi) east of Ningbo, China after a hull breach. The vessel sank with only the bridge above water. 13 of her 14 were crew rescued by the rescue ship Dong Hai Jiu 117 (China), 1 was reported missing.

== June ==
=== 4 June ===
List of shipwrecks: 4 June 2020
Ship	State	Description
Behbahan	Iran	The cargo ship sank after hitting an obstruction in the northern Persian Gulf southeast of Umm Qasr, Iraq, at a bridge construction site. Four crew were rescued and five others reported missing.
Höegh Xiamen	Norway	The car carrier was severely damaged by fire at Jacksonville, Florida, United States. Her 21 crew survived. She was consequently scrapped.

=== 9 June ===
List of shipwrecks: 9 June 2020
Ship	State	Description
TH 90282	Vietnam	The fishing vessel was sunk in a collision with the LPG tanker Annie Gas 09 (Vietnam) in the Gulf of Tonkin south south east of Haiphong, Vietnam. Three crew were rescued and four others reported missing.

=== 12 June ===
List of shipwrecks: 12 June 2020
Ship	State	Description
Stellar Banner	Marshall Islands	Deemed unseaworthy and uneconomical to repair after running aground on 24 February, the very large ore carrier was scuttled in deep water in the Atlantic Ocean 150 kilometres (93 mi) off Maranhão, Brazil. At the time she sank, she was the largest ship ever scuttled.

=== 15 June ===
List of shipwrecks: 9 June 2020
Ship	State	Description
Seven fishing vessels		Seven fishing vessels burned at Yanpu port, Donggang, Taiwan.

=== 15 June ===
List of shipwrecks: 9 June 2020
Ship	State	Description
"Jacinta"	United Kingdom	The 142.66-foot (43.48 m) museum ship, a retired fishing vessel, sank at dock in Fleetwood. Pumped out, reengined and used as a traveling museum ship at festivals.

=== 25 June ===
List of shipwrecks: 9 June 2020
Ship	State	Description
Arrow	Isle of Man	The ro-ro ferry ran aground at Aberdeen, United Kingdom. She was on a voyage from Lerwick, Shetland Islands to Aberdeen. She was refloated with assistance from a tug.
Multi Sahabat 8	Indonesia	The tug sank in the Singapore Strait in heavy seas. Four crew were rescued but her captain was reported missing, and the search was called off.

=== 27 June ===
List of shipwrecks: 27 June 2020
Ship	State	Description
Liberty 5	Philippines	The fishing vessel sank in a collision with Vienna Wood N (Hong Kong) in the Mindoro Strait 15 nautical miles (28 km; 17 mi) southwest of Paluan, Mindoro, Philippines. All hands missing, possibly 12–15.

=== 29 June ===
List of shipwrecks: 29 June 2020
Ship	State	Description
SAS Durban	South African Navy	The museum ship, a retired Ton-class minesweeper, sank partially above water at her berth in Durban, South Africa. Eventually raised and was open to tourists again in December, 2021.
Rivshan Morning Bird	Bangladesh	With 50 passengers aboard, the ferry — a motor launch — capsized and sank in 20 seconds in 60 to 70 feet (18 to 21 m) of water in the Buriganga River at Dhaka, Bangladesh, after the much larger motor ferry Moyur-2 (Bangladesh) accidentally rammed her from behind while Moyur-2 was reversing at high speed. At least 33 passengers and crew died. Rivshan Morning Bird was refloated on 30 June 2020.
Unidentified fishing boat	Malaysia	A fishing boat capsized near Pulau Perhentian, off the Bachok Coast in Malaysia. Of the eight on board, all were initially reported as missing, but all eight crew were later found deceased.

=== 30 June ===
List of shipwrecks: 30 June 2020
Ship	State	Description
Camar 1	Malaysia	The cargo ship sank in rough weather in the Malacca Strait near Jemur Island in shallow water, with her upper works above water. Nine crew were rescued by fishing boats.

== July ==
=== 12 July ===
List of shipwrecks: 12 July 2020
Ship	State	Description
USS Bonhomme Richard	United States Navy	USS Bonhomme Richard The Wasp-class amphibious assault ship was severely damaged by fire at Naval Base San Diego, California.

=== 14 July ===
List of shipwrecks: 14 July 2020
Ship	State	Description
KRI Teluk Jakarta	Indonesian Navy	The Frosch-I/Type 108 landing ship medium sank in the Java Sea northeast of Kangean Island, off Java in rough weather. All 55 on board were rescued.

=== 16 July ===
List of shipwrecks: 16 July 2020
Ship	State	Description
QNa 94727 TS	Vietnam	The fishing vessel was sunk in a collision with the bulk carrier Vinacomin Hanoi (Vietnam) in the South China Sea 4 nautical miles (7.4 km) south east of Đà Nẵng, Vietnam. Her six crew were rescued by other fishing vessels.

=== 17 July ===
List of shipwrecks: 17 July 2020
Ship	State	Description
Pemex 365	Mexico	The mooring boat was sunk when propwash from two tugs assisting a tanker unmoor that she was also assisting slammed the boat into a pier at the Pajaritos Oil Terminal, Veracruz, Mexico, on the Gulf of Mexico coast. Seven crew were rescued, two others were reported missing.

=== 19 July ===
List of shipwrecks: 19 July 2020
Ship	State	Description
Nordic Wolverine	Norway	The tanker ran aground at the entrance to the harbor at Barranquilla, Colombia. The vessel was refloated on 30 July.

=== 24 July ===
List of shipwrecks: 24 July 2020
Ship	State	Description
Brian Davis	United States	The 180-foot (55 m) memorial vessel — formerly the decommissioned buoy tender USCGC Salvia ( United States Coast Guard) — was scuttled in southern Onslow Bay off Topsail Beach, North Carolina, about 15 nautical miles (28 km) from Topsail Inlet and 18 nautical miles (33 km) from Masonboro Inlet at 34°09.514′N 077°25.782′W to form an artificial reef.
Djo No 3	Indonesia	The aggregate carrier drifted on to rocks and sank with upper works above water in shallow water off Masalembu Island the Java Sea in rough weather. Nine people were rescued, while seven others remained on board.

=== 25 July ===
List of shipwrecks: 25 July 2020
Ship	State	Description
Wakashio	Panama	The Japanese-owned bulk carrier ran aground on Pointe d'Esny, Mauritius and split in two by mid August. Her crew were evacuated safely. Due to rough seas, efforts to pump the 3,800 tonnes (3,700 long tons; 4,200 short tons) of bunker fuel and 200 tonnes (200 long tons; 220 short tons) of diesel failed, and by 7 August an oil slick formed around the ship. There are fears that the oil will pollute the Pointe d'Esny Wetland and the Blue Bay Marine Park (both Ramsar sites).

=== 26 July ===
List of shipwrecks: 26 July 2020
Ship	State	Description
Hongxiang	China	The sand carrier capsized and sank in the Taiwan Strait 60 nautical miles (110 km; 69 mi) south west of Penghu Island. Four crew were killed, four others reported missing, while one person was rescued by a Taiwanese search-and-rescue vessel.

=== 27 July ===
List of shipwrecks: 27 July 2020
Ship	State	Description
Jin Hong 89	China	The cargo ship capsized and sank in the East China Sea 6 nautical miles (11 km) north of Dachen Island in a collision with Jin Shuang Long 3 (China). All 11 crew were rescued by the search-and-rescue vessel Dong Hai Jiu 115 (China).

=== 31 July ===
List of shipwrecks: 27 July 2020
Ship	State	Description
Non-flagged ASV (AAV-7A1)	United States	During a military exercise near Camp Pendleton, a United States Marine Corps assault amphibious vehicle carrying 15 troops, sank. Four Marines were rescued uninjured, two other Marines were rescued, one in critical, and one in stable. Eight other Marines were reported missing, and one Marine was killed.

== August ==
=== 1 August ===
List of shipwrecks: 1 August 2020
Ship	State	Description
Raja 4	Thailand	The ferry capsized and sank in the Gulf of Siam off Ko Samui, Thailand. Nine crew were rescued, three were reported missing. Her captain and probably three others drowned.

=== 2 August ===
List of shipwrecks: 2 August 2020
Ship	State	Description
High Season or Lai Si Chan 1	Thailand	The dinner/dance vessel capsized and sank at dock in Bangkok, Thailand after taking on water during a cruise on the Chao Phraya River causing a list to starboard.

=== 4 August ===
List of shipwrecks: 4 August 2020
Ship	State	Description
Abou Karim I	Lebanon	2020 Beirut explosions: The livestock carrier was severely damaged in the explosion.
Abou Karim III	Lebanon	2020 Beirut explosions: The livestock carrier was severely damaged in the explosion.
Amadeo II	Lebanon	2020 Beirut explosions: The tanker was driven onto the quayside and destroyed in the explosion.
Baltagi 17, Baltagi 19, and Baltagi 20	Lebanon	2020 Beirut explosions: The tugs were close to the site of the explosion. Baltagi 17 was repaired and returned to service but Baltagi 19 and Baltagi 20 were damaged beyond repair and scrapped.
BNS Bijoy	Bangladesh Navy	2020 Beirut explosions: The Castle-class patrol vessel was damaged in the explosion. Twenty-one sailors were injured.
City of Rome	Isle of Man	2020 Beirut explosions: The vehicle carrier was close to the site of the explosion. The ship was repaired and returned to service.
DPS Tramontane	Saint Vincent and the Grenadines	2020 Beirut explosions: The tug was close to the site of the explosion. The ship was repaired and returned to service.
Jouri	Lebanon	2020 Beirut explosions: The livestock carrier was close to the site of the explosion. Her AIS stopped broadcasting at the time of the explosion. The ship was later repaired and returned to service.
Mero Star	Sierra Leone	2020 Beirut explosions: The cargo ship was severely damaged in the explosion and was later scrapped.
Orient Queen	Bahamas	2020 Beirut explosions: The cruise ship was severely damaged in the explosion. She capsized and sank the next day. Two crew were reported to have been killed.
Raouf H	Comoros	2020 Beirut explosions: The cargo ship was closest to the point of the explosion and was severely damaged. The ship was later scrapped.

=== 11 August ===
List of shipwrecks: 11 August 2020
Ship	State	Description
Arctic Fox II	Canada	A distress call was received by the United States Coast Guard at 2pm PST from the 20-metre (66 ft) commercial fishing vessel. The vessel was operating 135 kilometres (84 mi) off Cape Flattery, Washington. A helicopter was dispatched, which found one crewman aboard a lifeboat. The other two crew members were killed. The survivor was taken to Neah Bay, Washington.

=== 13 August ===
List of shipwrecks: 13 August 2020
Ship	State	Description
Reedville	United States	The 180-foot (55 m) menhaden-fishing boat — was scuttled in the Atlantic Ocean in 87 feet (27 m) of water 16 nautical miles (30 km) off the coast of Delaware at 38°40.423′N 074°44.295′W to form part of an artificial reef system.

=== 15 August ===
List of shipwrecks: 15 August 2020
Ship	State	Description
Akhter Banu-1	Bangladesh	The lighter sank near Hatiya Island, Bangladesh. The 13 crew were reported missing.
City-14	Bangladesh	The lighter sank near Hatiya Island, Bangladesh. All 12 crew were rescued.

=== 20 August ===
List of shipwrecks: 20 August 2020
Ship	State	Description
Unknown barge	China	A barge sank in a collision with Long Qing 1 (China) in the Yangtze River estuary. Long Qing 1 was set on fire with her 14 crew reported missing.

=== 27 August ===
List of shipwrecks: 20 August 2020
Ship	State	Description
Bad Attitude	United States	Hurricane Laura: The shrimp boat broke her mooring lines and sank in Bayou Contraband, Lake Charles, Louisiana.
Dara Mae	United States	Hurricane Laura: The 78-foot (24 m) shrimp boat broke her mooring lines smashed into another boat and sank in Bayou Contraband, Lake Charles, Louisiana.
Golden Eagle	United States	Hurricane Laura: The 50-foot (15 m) shrimp boat broke her mooring lines, smashed into another boat and sank in Bayou Contraband, Lake Charles, Louisiana.
Isle of Capri	United States	Hurricane Laura: The casino boat broke her mooring lines and smashed into the I-10 bridge over the Calcasieu River at Lake Charles, Louisiana, wrecking her.
USS Orleck	United States Navy	Hurricane Laura: The decommissioned Gearing-class destroyer museum ship broke loose from her moorings in the Calcasieu River and drifted one mile (1.6 km) down river before drifting aground.
Unknown shrimp boats	United States	Hurricane Laura: Seven other shrimp boats sank in Bayou Contraband, Lake Charles, Louisiana.
Two unknown shrimp boats	United States	Hurricane Laura: Two shrimp boats broke loose and sank at Cut Off, Louisiana.

=== 30 August ===
List of shipwrecks: 30 August 2020
Ship	State	Description
USS Durham	United States Navy	USS Durham The decommissioned Charleston-class amphibious cargo ship was sunk as a target in the Pacific Ocean north of Kauai, Hawaii.
Min Jin Yu 05119	China	The fishing vessel sank in a collision with an unknown ship in the Taiwan Strait some 45 nautical miles (83 km) east of Pintang Island, Fujian, China. Two crew were rescued, with 12 others reported missing.

=== 31 August ===
List of shipwrecks: 31 August 2020
Ship	State	Description
Sir Gaetan	Mauritius	The tug sprung a leak and sank in stormy weather off Poudre d'Or, Mauritius in the Indian Ocean. Four crew were rescued, with two others killed and two crew reported missing.

== September ==
=== 3 September ===
List of shipwrecks: 3 September 2020
Ship	State	Description
Gulf Livestock 1	Panama	Typhoon Maysak: The livestock carrier reportedly lost power and capsized after being hit by a wave in the Sea of Japan. Two crewmembers were rescued, one body was recovered, and the other 41 crewmembers were reported missing, presumed lost. Six thousand cattle were lost in the sinking.
New Diamond	Panama	The very large crude carrier caught fire near the eastern coast of Sri Lanka carrying 270,000 tons of crude oil resulting in the death of a single crew member.

=== 5 September ===
List of shipwrecks: 5 September 2020
Ship	State	Description
Unidentified small boats	United States	A boat parade took place in support of Donald Trump's re-election campaign on Lake Travis in central Texas. The weather was calm, but the boats generated significant wake as they began to move together, which subsequently sank at least five boats.

=== 7 September ===
List of shipwrecks: 7 September 2020
Ship	State	Description
Unidentified boat	United States	A 19-foot (5.8 m) aluminum boat sank in Puget Sound about 400 yards (370 m) offshore Edmonds, Washington. Five people and two dogs were rescued.

=== 10 September ===
List of shipwrecks: 10 September 2020
Ship	State	Description
Dylan	Unknown	The 51-foot (16 m) sailboat, seized as a drug smuggling vessel in the U.S. while being transported from Martinique to Australia, was sunk as an artificial reef in the Gulf of Mexico in 250 feet (76 m) of water 16 nautical miles (30 km) south east of Destin, Florida.

=== 11 September ===
List of shipwrecks: 11 September 2020
Ship	State	Description
Responder	South Korea	The cable layer caught fire west of the southern tip of Tsushima Island in the South China Sea, sinking the next day. The crew evacuated to another cable layer she was working with.

=== 12 September ===
List of shipwrecks: 12 September 2020
Ship	State	Description
Chang Shun 1	Panama	The reefer suffered engine failure and drifted ashore on Mitsu Island, north of Tsushima Island, in the Sea of Japan, and appeared to be partially sunk. The crew was safe.
Wooden Mistress	United States	The 52-foot (16 m) cabin cruiser sprung a leak and sank 28 miles (45 km) south of Eureka, California. The crew was rescued by the United States Coast Guard.

=== 16 September ===
List of shipwrecks: 10 September 2020
Ship	State	Description
KS 1451	United States	Hurricane Sally: The construction barge broke loose from her moorings, or dragged anchor, and was driven ashore partially sunk on Bayfront Parkway, Pensacola, Florida.
KS 4004	United States	Hurricane Sally: The construction barge broke loose from her moorings, or dragged anchor, and was driven ashore in Escambia Bay along Dolphin Road, Milton, Florida.
KS 4015	United States	Hurricane Sally: The construction barge broke loose from her moorings, or dragged anchor, and was driven ashore in Escambia Bay, Pensacola, Florida.
KS 6010	United States	Hurricane Sally: The construction barge broke loose from her moorings, or dragged anchor, and was driven ashore in Escambia Bay near Windrose Circle, Pensacola, Florida.
M 8033	United States	Hurricane Sally: The construction barge broke loose from her moorings, or dragged anchor, and was driven ashore in Escambia Bay along Dolphin Road, Milton, Florida.
Niña	United States	Hurricane Sally: The replica of Christopher Columbus's ship went adrift after her dock broke up. Her anchor line later snapped causing her to go ashore in Pensacola Bay near the Maritime Park.
Skanska 470027	United States	Hurricane Sally: The construction barge broke loose from her moorings, or dragged anchor, and was driven ashore near Naval Air Station, Pensacola, Pensacola, Florida.
Unknown barges	United States	Hurricane Sally: 22 construction barges, including those listed, broke loose from their moorings, or dragged anchor, and were driven ashore in parts of Pensacola Bay and Escambia Bay.

=== 20 September ===
List of shipwrecks: 20 September 2020
Ship	State	Description
Amorella	Finland	The Ro-Pax ferry scraped bottom and sprung a leak off Åland, west of Turku, Finland. She was beached on an island to prevent sinking.

=== 21 September ===
List of shipwrecks: 21 September 2020
Ship	State	Description
Sheng Hang 189	China	The cargo ship was sunk in a collision with the fishing vessel Zhexiangyuyuno 3123 (China) south of Shanghai, China, in the East China Sea. Her crew of six were rescued.

=== 22 September ===
List of shipwrecks: 22 September 2020
Ship	State	Description
Margrel	Australia	Wreckage was found near Murray Mouth after a distress call was sent from near Granite Island in South Australia. Only one person was on board and was declared missing.

=== 26 September ===
List of shipwrecks: 26 September 2020
Ship	State	Description
MSV Krishna Sudama	India	The cargo ship sank in rough weather in the Gulf of Kutch in the Arabian Sea, some 10 nautical miles (19 km) off Okha, Gujarat State, India. Her crew of 12 were rescued by the ICGS C-411 (Indian Coast Guard).

== October ==
=== 8 October ===
List of shipwrecks: 8 October 2020
Ship	State	Description
Thanh Thanh Dat 55	Vietnam	The cargo ship sank in a storm off Cửa Việt, Vietnam in the South China Sea. Her crew was rescued.
Vietship 01	Vietnam	The dredger was driven aground in a storm off Cửa Việt in the South China Sea. Two of the crew reached shore, two were swept away, but rescued, and eight remained on board.

=== 10 October ===
List of shipwrecks: 10 October 2020
Ship	State	Description
Jakarta	Indonesia	The decommissioned cargo ship was pushed ashore in a storm off Thừa Thiên–Huế Province, Vietnam, in the South China Sea north of Đà Nẵng after losing her tow while on the way to be scrapped. She broke in two, probably a total loss.
Minh Nam 07	Vietnam	The cargo ship was pushed ashore in a storm off Ky Anh, Vietnam, in the South China Sea. Her crew was rescued.
Unknown fishing vessel	Vietnam	The fishing vessel sank in a storm while attempting to rescue crew from the beached dredger Vietship 01 (Vietnam) off Cửa Việt, Vietnam in the South China Sea.

=== 11 October ===
List of shipwrecks: 11 October 2020
Ship	State	Description
Dong Bac 22-03	Vietnam	Tropical Storm Linfa: The cargo ship was pushed ashore in a storm at Đà Nẵng, Vietnam, in the South China Sea. Her crew remained safe on board.
Viet Thang 09	Vietnam	Tropical Storm Linfa: The cargo ship was pushed ashore in a storm at Dung Quất, Quảng Ngãi Province, Vietnam in the South China Sea. Her crew remained safe on board.

=== 13 October ===
List of shipwrecks: 13 October 2020
Ship	State	Description
Shunan 66	China	The sand carrier capsized and sank in the Hainan Strait. Six crew were rescued, two died, four others were reported missing.

=== 14 October ===
List of shipwrecks: 14 October 2020
Ship	State	Description
Noah Satu	Indonesia	The cargo ship ran aground on Sebuku Island in the Sunda Strait. The vessel was refloated by a tug on 18 October and taken to Bakauheni, Sumatra.

=== 15 October ===
List of shipwrecks: 15 October 2020
Ship	State	Description
Geo Searcher	Belize	The research vessel sprung a leak after striking a reef off Gough Island in the South Atlantic Ocean and sank. The crew and researchers made it to Gough Island.

=== 17 October ===
List of shipwrecks: 17 October 2020
Ship	State	Description
VTB Star	Vietnam	The bulk carrier dragged anchor was pushed ashore in a storm at Ba Đồn, Quảng Bình Province, Vietnam, in the Gulf of Tonkin.

=== 23 October ===
List of shipwrecks: 23 October 2020
Ship	State	Description
Seatran Ferry 12	Tuvalu	The passenger ro-ro cargo ship sank in the Taiwan Strait off Kaohsiung in rough weather. Five crew were rescued by Taiwan, five others were reported missing.

=== 24 October ===
List of shipwrecks: 24 October 2020
Ship	State	Description
Suntud Samut 3	Thailand	The cargo ship ran aground in the Gulf of Thailand off Surat Thani Province, Thailand, east of Koh Samui and developed a list. Her ten crew abandoned ship and were picked up by fishing boats.

=== 24 October ===
List of shipwrecks: 27 October 2020
Ship	State	Description
General Hazi Aslanov	Turkey	A boiler explosion was suffered by the oil tanker, owned by Palmali Shipping, a Turkish shipping company. The ship was en route from the port of Kavkaz to Rostov-Na-Don. The ship may have had temporary ownership by the Russian Federation. The boiler explosion injured 4 sailors, but 10 of the 13 on board, including the injured were evacuated. However, 3 of the 13 on board were reported missing.

=== 25 October ===
List of shipwrecks: 25 October 2020
Ship	State	Description
Nam Khanh 36	Vietnam	The cargo ship suffered a blackout and drifted onto a reef causing a breach off Vietnam. She was beached to prevent sinking. crew safe.

=== 26 October ===
List of shipwrecks: 27 October 2020
Ship	State	Description
Unidentified migrant boat	Iran	A small boat carrying 19 migrants from Iran capsized because of poor weather conditions. Four people, a man, a woman, and two children, died. The boat was travelling near Dunkirk, France sailing from France to the United Kingdom, but was carrying migrants who had recently arrived in the United Kingdom from Iran.

=== 27 October ===
List of shipwrecks: 27 October 2020
Ship	State	Description
HS Kallisto	Hellenic Navy	The Evropi-class mine countermeasures vessel collided with the container ship Maersk Launceston (Portugal) off Piraeus and was severely damaged. Kallisto was cut in two. Her stern section apparently sank and her bow section developed a severe list and was taken in tow for Piraeus.

=== 29 October ===
List of shipwrecks: 27 October 2020
Ship	State	Description
Unidentified migrant boat	Senegal	An unidentified boat carrying refugees from Senegal caught fire, capsized, and then sank off of Senegal and the Canary Islands. It was carrying at least 140 migrants. A rescue operation is underway by the navies and coast guards of Senegal and Spain. It is the deadliest shipwreck of 2020. So far, 140 people are presumed drowned.

=== 30 October ===
List of shipwrecks: 30 October 2020
Ship	State	Description
Unidentified refugee boat	Mozambique	An unidentified boat carrying refugees sank near Ilha Makalowe, Mozambique. The boat was carrying 74 people. Out of the 74 people on the boat, 54 drowned.

=== 31 October ===
List of shipwrecks: 31 October 2020
Ship	State	Description
Tiffany of Melfort	United Kingdom	Storm Aiden. The landing craft and fish farming support vessel was swept from her moorings in Loch Pooltiel, Glendale, Skye, Scotland and later grounded on the Shiant Islands, east of Harris, Outer Hebrides, becoming a total loss.

== November ==
=== 2 November ===
List of shipwrecks: 2 November 2020
Ship	State	Description
Enchanted Capri	Mexico	The decommissioned former cruise ship/accommodations vessel dragged anchor in a storm and went aground at Alvarado, Veracruz, Mexico, in the Gulf of Mexico. The vessel was abandoned and still aground as of December 2021.

=== 3 November ===
List of shipwrecks: 3 November 2020
Ship	State	Description
Baba Selavi	Turkey	The tour boat, which was carrying 33 Russian tourists sank, after capsizing off the coast of Alanya. The Turkish Coast Guard intervened and took part in diving operations after the ship sunk. 32 of the 33 people on board, as well as the 5 Turkish Coast Guard members who got onto the boat as it was sinking to aid tourists were saved. However, there was one fatality.

=== 6 November ===
List of shipwrecks: 6 November 2020
Ship	State	Description
Thanh Hung 08	Vietnam	Tropical Storm Goni: The cargo ship sank off Quảng Nam Province, Vietnam in the South China Sea. Seven of her crew were rescued. Her master and four others were reported missing.

=== 8 November ===
List of shipwrecks: 8 November 2020
Ship	State	Description
Unknown fishing vessel	United Kingdom	A fishing vessel was sunk in a collision with an unknown ship one mile (1.6 km) off Tyne Piers, Tynemouth, United Kingdom. Two crew were rescued.

=== 9 November ===
List of shipwrecks: 9 November 2020
Ship	State	Description
Gia Bao 268	Vietnam	Tropical Storm Etau: The cargo ship dragged anchor in a typhoon and was driven ashore at Dung Quat, Quảng Ngãi Province, Vietnam.

=== 10 November ===
List of shipwrecks: 10 November 2020
Ship	State	Description
Hoang Tuan 26	Vietnam	Tropical Storm Etau: The cargo ship dragged anchor in a typhoon around 10 November and was driven ashore at Cửa Việt, Quảng Trị Province, Vietnam at the mouth of the Thạch Hãn River. The vessel is to be refloated.
Thanh Thanh Dat 68	Vietnam	Tropical Storm Etau: The cargo ship dragged anchor in a typhoon around 10 November and was driven ashore at Cửa Việt, Quảng Trị Province, Vietnam at the mouth of the Thạch Hãn River. The vessel was to be refloated.

=== 11 November ===
List of shipwrecks: 11 November 2020
Ship	State	Description
Unknown fishing vessel	Turkey	A fishing vessel was capsized and sunk in a collision with Ephesos (Greece) south of Karataş, Adana Province, Turkey, in the Mediterranean Sea. All five crew were lost.

=== 12 November ===
List of shipwrecks: 12 November 2020
Ship	State	Description
Peter Roennna	Gibraltar	The out of service freighter dragged anchor in a typhoon and was driven ashore at Pasay, Manila, Philippines.

=== 13 November ===
List of shipwrecks: 13 November 2020
Ship	State	Description
Just Mine	Jersey	The yacht burned and sank one nautical mile (1.9 km; 1.2 mi) off Aigio, Greece, in the Gulf of Corinth.

=== 17 November ===
List of shipwrecks: 17 November 2020
Ship	State	Description
Kerinci Indah 02	Indonesia	The fishing vessel was capsized and sunk in a collision, or close contact with cargo ship Cape Kallia (Cyprus) in the Indian Ocean 55 nautical miles (102 km) south east of Bali. Seven crew were rescued by Cape Kallia, four others were reported missing.
Unidentified police boat	United States	A 24-foot (7.3 m) Tulalip fisheries vessel capsized around 8:30 PM PST off the coast of Jetty Island in Puget Sound. Two Tulalip Tribes police officers were thrown from the boat. The captain, was rescued by tribal fishermen near Hat Island, Washington, while the other officer, was presumed dead.

=== 18 November ===
List of shipwrecks: 18 November 2020
Ship	State	Description
Unidentified fishing boat	Malaysia	A fishing boat sank in stormy weather. While one person was saved, three crew and the captain were reported missing and presumed dead.

=== 20 November ===
List of shipwrecks: 20 November 2020
Ship	State	Description
Carmen	Brazil	The offshore supply tug capsized and sank near Petrobras P-48 Platform, Campos Basin, Brazil, in 250 metres (820 ft) of water, some 55 nautical miles (102 km) east of Cabo de Sao Tome, northeast of Rio de Janeiro. All 18 crew were rescued.

=== 23 November ===
List of shipwrecks: 23 November 2020
Ship	State	Description
Emmy Rose	United States	The fishing vessel sank off Provincetown, Massachusetts. The crew were reported missing.
Shahraz	Iran	The container ship, aground near Batam, Indonesia, since 10 May 2020, was struck by Tina 1 (Cyprus). The stern of Shahraz suffered significant damage.
Tina 1	Cyprus	The container ship was driven ashore near Batam, Indonesia, after striking the stern of the container ship Shahraz (Iran) which was already aground.

=== 25 November ===
List of shipwrecks: 25 November 2020
Ship	State	Description
Lady Athena	Philippines	The civilian landing craft capsized and sank off the Cambari Islands, Palawan, Philippines, in the Sulu Sea in stormy weather. 15 crew were rescued, 2 others were reported missing.

=== 28 November ===
List of shipwrecks: 28 November 2020
Ship	State	Description
Unnamed container ship	None	A section of a container ship under construction at Kaohsiung Ship Yard, Kaohsiung, Taiwan, sank while being moved in the yard. Refloating was expected.
Unknown fishing vessel	Japan	A fishing vessel was sunk in a collision with cargo ship Hayato (Japan) off Kashima, Japan, north of Tokyo, Japan. All 12 on board rescued, but 1 later died.

== December ==
=== 3 December ===
List of shipwrecks: 3 December
Ship	State	Description
Baffin Bay	United Kingdom	The fishing trawler burned, capsized and sank at dock in shallow water, with the vessel remaining partially above water, at Vigo, Spain.

=== 5 December ===
List of shipwrecks: 5 December 2020
Ship	State	Description
Hai Ha 28	China	The cargo ship sprung a leak and sank at anchor off Cu Lao Cham (Cham Islands), Quảng Nam Province, Vietnam, in the South China Sea. The vessel remained partially above water. The crew and passengers were evacuated.
Ivana D	Unknown	The unmanned gas drilling platform collapsed and sank in a storm in the northern Adriatic Sea 27 nautical miles (50 km) north west of Pula, Croatia. The wreck was located on 11 December.

=== 10 December ===
List of shipwrecks: 10 December 2020
Ship	State	Description
Huy Hoang 18	Vietnam	The cargo ship struck a reef off a small islet, or the islet itself, filled, and sank 4 nautical miles (7.4 km) off Phù Mỹ District, Bình Định Province, Vietnam in the South China Sea. All nine crew and two passengers were rescued.
Jin Hui	Sierra Leone	The cargo ship ran aground on Nangan Island, Matsu Islands, Lienchiang County, Taiwan, in the South China Sea. The vessel was refloated and towed to Fuao, Nangan Island where she filled, capsized and sank in the harbor, partially above water. The crew were safe.

=== 13 December ===
List of shipwrecks: 13 December 2020
Ship	State	Description
Xin Qi Sheng 69	China	The container ship was sunk in a collision with the container ship Oceana (Antigua and Barbuda) in the Yangtze River Estuary. Eight crew were rescued, three killed, and five were reported missing.

=== 15 December ===
List of shipwrecks: 15 December
Ship	State	Description
Bahtera Salbach	Indonesia	The coastal cargo boat was sunk in a collision with the container ship KMTC Jebel Ali (South Korea) off Surabaya. All eight crew were rescued.
Chief William Saulis	Canada	Debris from the 15-metre (50 ft) fishing vessel that operated out of Yarmouth, Nova Scotia began washing ashore. The vessel had departed on 12 December from Yarmouth, fishing off the coast of Nova Scotia. Attempts to contact the vessel failed and the six-person crew were presumed dead.
Gwalad-y-Mor	United Kingdom	The fishing vessel was severely damaged by the explosion of a Second World War bomb whilst fishing off the north Norfolk coast. Her seven crew were rescued by Esvagt Njord (Denmark). Gwalad-y-Mor was towed in to Grimsby, Lincolnshire in a waterlogged condition by the tug GPS Avenger (United Kingdom).
TSHD King Richard X	Indonesia	The out of service hopper dredge filled and sank at Batu Ampat, Indonesia in the Singapore Strait. The four maintenance crew on board were evacuated before she sank.

=== 17 December ===
List of shipwrecks: 17 December
Ship	State	Description
Unknown boat	unknown	A 5.4-metre (17 ft 9 in), fibreglass-hulled ghost ship washed ashore at Ailuk Atoll in the Marshall Islands. No crew was found, but the vessel was found to contain 649 kilograms (1,431 lb) of cocaine. The wreck occurred approximately one week prior to 17 December, but the discovery of the cargo was not made until 17 December. The boat was not flagged under any country, and may be from Central or South America, and may have been at sea up to two years before appearing at Ailuk.
Xin Hong 18	Panama	The cargo ship capsized and sank in rough weather 1.4 nautical miles (2.6 km) off Phú Quý Island, Bình Thuận Province, Vietnam, in the South China Sea north east of Vũng Tàu. All 15 crew were reported missing.

=== 18 December ===
List of shipwrecks: 18 December 2020
Ship	State	Description
Jin Hang Yu 10	China	The cargo ship ran aground at Penglai, China in the Yellow Sea. The vessel's hull was breached and engine room flooded. All 18 crew were air evacuated.

=== 19 December ===
List of shipwrecks: 19 December 2020
Ship	State	Description
KS 6010	United States	The construction barge broke loose from her moorings, or mooring line cut on purpose, and drifted ashore in Pensacola Bay, at Gulf Breeze, Florida. The vessel was pulled off by tugs on 20 December.

=== 21 December ===
List of shipwrecks: 21 December 2020
Ship	State	Description
Dong Yang	Sierra Leone	The cargo ship developed a list and sank in stormy weather in the South China Sea off Vietnam. The crew were rescued by the LNG tanker Al Samriya (Marshall Islands) and the container ship JPO Pisces (Liberia).

=== 24 December ===
List of shipwrecks: 24 December 2020
Ship	State	Description
Unknown boat	Tunisia	A migrant boat sank off the coat of Tunisia. The vessel was carrying 45 people of which 20 drowned.

=== 26 December ===
List of shipwrecks: 26 December 2020
Ship	State	Description
Unknown boat	Uganda	A boat capsized in Lake Albert along the border between Uganda and the Democratic Republic of Congo. The vessel was carrying dozens of people and was pushed over by a "strong wind." At least 26 people drowned and 21 were rescued.

=== 28 December ===
List of shipwrecks: 28 December 2020
Ship	State	Description
Onega	Russia	The fishing trawler iced up and capsized during a snowstorm in the Barents Sea west of Yuzhniy Island in the Novaya Zemlya archipelago. Out of the 19 people on board 17 fishermen were reported missing and two were rescued by a passing ship.

=== 29 December ===
List of shipwrecks: 29 December 2020
Ship	State	Description
Thun Liffey	Ireland	The tanker ran aground off the Lough Foyle river mouth in Northern Ireland. All crew were safe. The ship was refloated in less than a day after the initial incident.

=== 31 December ===
List of shipwrecks: 31 December 2020
Ship	State	Description
Dinghaoji 7	China	The cargo ship sprung a leak on 30 December, sinking the next day in Hangzhou Bay, south of Shanghai, China. Out of the 13 people on board, 2 were killed, 7 were reported missing and 4 were rescued.

== Unknown date ==
List of shipwrecks: Unknown date in 2020
Ship	State	Description
HMS Northumberland	Royal Navy	The Type 23 frigate collided with a Russian Navy submarine in the Arctic Ocean in late 2020. The incident was filmed by Channel 5 as part of their Warship: Life at Sea series, broadcast in 2021–22.
