= Jemur Island =

Island in Indonesia

Coordinates: 2°53′N 100°34′E

Pulau Jemur
- Interactive map of Jemur Island

Geography
- Location: Rokan Hilir, Indonesia

Jemur Island (Indonesian: Pulau Jemur) is an island of Indonesia which is located in the Strait of Malacca, about 45 miles or 72.4 kilometers from capital of Rokan Hilir regency, Bagansiapiapi, and about 45 miles from Malaysia. Actually, Pulau Jemur is named for several of small island, the isles are Pulau Tekong Emas, Pulau Tekong Simbang, Pulau Labuhan Bilik and some others small isles.

Pulau Jemur has a good natural sea view and beautiful panorama, and serves as home for sea turtles. It has a strategic location on the Strait of Malacca; during the Second World War, the Japanese built a defence on here.

Many places can be found there, such as Japanese Cave, Light House tower,

Pulau Jemur has a natural golden sand beaches. Local government are trying to develop it as a resort area.

Jemur islands are uninhabited and only a stopover place for fishermen who are to sea. A post of Indonesian Navy (TNI-AL) was established in this island for the purposes of observation and navigation. Currently, there is no accommodation in this island.

There is no regular transportation to the island. However, one can rent a speedboat from Bagansiapiapi (takes about 1.5–2 hours) or Panipahan (takes about 1 hour).

== Controversy ==
In August 2009, Malaysian claim of the Island as part of Selangor state sparked resentment and protest in the Indonesian community. Jemur Island is part of Rokan Hilir, Indonesia not Malaysia. Pulau Jemur is included as part of a tourist destination in Selangor. However, the claim was based on a travel Website of unidentifiable origin that inaccurately listed Jemur Island as part of Malaysia. Note that there is no plausible link whatsoever between the Website and the Malaysia government or any Malaysian. The news station went on to ask a Riau government official's comment on the “claim.” Misled by the channel, the government official immediately reacted by stating that Malaysia has no right to claim Jemur Island, without pausing to question the accuracy of the news. The news turned out to be another news TV hoax, as later verified by the general counsel of Malaysia and the director of tourism in Medan.

== See also ==
- Riau
- Bagansiapiapi
- Rokan Hilir
- Sinaboi
- Panipahan
- Pulau Halang
