= Rokan =

Rokan is the name of the landscape and area in Riau Province.

- Rokan River, river in Riau Province
- Rokan Hulu Regency, Regency in Riau, Indonesia
- Rokan Hilir Regency, Regency in Riau, Indonesia
