= Halang =

Halang may refer to:

- Halang, Calamba, a barangay in Laguna, Philippines
- Halang, Ukhrul, a village in Manipur, India
- Halang Island, in Rokan Hilir, Riau, Indonesia
- Halang language, a language spoken in Vietnam and Laos
- Halang, a barangay in the municipality of Taal, Batangas, Philippines
- Halang, a subtribe and linguistic variety of the Tangsa language spoken in North East India
