= List of shipwrecks in April 1852 =

The list of shipwrecks in April 1852 includes ships sunk, foundered, wrecked, grounded, or otherwise lost during April 1852.

== 1 April ==
List of shipwrecks: 1 April 1852
Ship	State	Description
Albertina Geyma	Netherlands	The ship was wrecked in the Vlie. Her crew were rescued. She was on a voyage from Amsterdam, North Holland to Elbing.
Johanna Gesina	Bremen	The ship driven ashore and wrecked on Eierland, North Holland. She was on a voyage from Hull, Yorkshire, United Kingdom to Bremen.
Lucinde	Prussia	The brig ran aground near Trelleborg, Sweden. She was on a voyage from Memel to London, United Kingdom. She was later refloated and resumed her voyage.
Maria	Hamburg	The ship was in collision with a British schooner and sank in the North Sea. Her crew were rescued. She was on a voyage from Hamburg to Leven, Fife, United Kingdom.
Rainbow	United States	The schooner foundered off New York with the loss of all four crew.
Sir William Wallace	United Kingdom	The ship ran aground on the Nore. She was on a voyage from Leith, Lothian, to London. She was refloated and resumed her voyage.

== 2 April ==
List of shipwrecks: 2 April 1852
Ship	State	Description
Ann	United Kingdom	The ship ran aground at Saint-Valery-sur-Somme, Somme, France. She was on a voyage from South Shields, County Durham to Saint-Valery-sur-Somme. She was refloated the next day and taken in to Saint-Valery-sur-Somme in a leaky condition.
Eglantine	United Kingdom	The ship ran aground and was severely damaged at Saint-Valery-sur-Somme. She was on a voyage from Newcastle upon Tyne, Northumberland to Saint-Valery-sur-Somme.
Independence	United States	The ship was wrecked at Matagorda, Texas with much loss of life.
Nyverheid	Netherlands	The ship foundered off "Pentrel Island". Her crew were rescued. She was on a voyage from Amsterdam, North Holland to Bayonne, Basses-Pyrénées, France.
Samuel C. Nelson	United Kingdom	The ship was driven ashore on São Miguel Island, Azores.

== 3 April ==
List of shipwrecks: 3 April 1852
Ship	State	Description
Daisy	United Kingdom	The sloop was driven ashore on the Isle of Skye. She was on a voyage from Arklow, County Wicklow to Newcastle upon Tyne, Northumberland. She was refloated and taken in to Corry, Isle of Skye in a severely damaged condition.
Glencoe	United States	The steamboat exploded at St. Louis, Missouri with loss of life.
Redstone	United States	The steamboat suffered a boiler explosion near Carrolston, Indiana. Twenty-one people were killed, 25 were injured.

== 4 April ==
List of shipwrecks: 4 April 1852
Ship	State	Description
Despatch	United Kingdom	The ship was driven ashore and damaged at Larache, Morocco.
Glencoe	United States	The steamboat suffered a boiler explosion, caught fire and sank in the Mississippi River at Saint Louis, Missouri with much loss of life. Three other vessels were damaged, with some further loss of life.
Jessica	United Kingdom	The ship caught fire and was abandoned in the Atlantic Ocean 300 nautical miles (560 km) off Sal, Cape Verde Islands. Her crew were rescued by Titania (United Kingdom). Jessica was on a voyage from London to Rio de Janeiro, Empire of Brazil.
John Mayo	United States	The ship was wrecked on the South Heads, California. She was on a voyage from San Francisco, California to Hong Kong.
Mersey	United Kingdom	The ship was driven ashore on North Uist, Outer Hebrides. She was on a voyage from Callao, Peru to Leith, Lothian. She was refloated and resumed her voyage, arriving at Leith on 13 April in a severely leaky condition.

== 5 April ==
List of shipwrecks: 5 April 1852
Ship	State	Description
Blythswood	United Kingdom	The ship was destroyed by fire at Coringa, India.
Diadem	United Kingdom	The barque ran aground and was wrecked in the Pentland Firth. She was on a voyage from Newcastle upon Tyne, Northumberland to Montreal, Province of Canada, British North America.
Maria Louisa	Prussia	The ship was driven ashore on Bornholm, Denmark. Her crew were rescued. She was on a voyage from an Irish port to Memel. Maria Louisa was consequently condemned.

== 6 April ==
List of shipwrecks: 6 April 1852
Ship	State	Description
Anne Johanna	Norway	The ship ran aground on the Haisborough Sands, in the North Sea off the coast of Norfolk, United Kingdom. She was on a voyage from Sarpsborg to the Île d'Oléron, Charente-Maritime, France.
Concordia	Kingdom of Hanover	The ship was in collision with a brig. She then struck the Berner Rock, off the coast of Lothian, United Kingdom, capsized and sank. Her crew were rescued. She was on a voyage from Bo'ness, Lothian to Altona, Hamburg.
Hannah Rebecca	Kingdom of Hanover	The galiot collided with the steamship Propontis (United Kingdom) and sank in the English Channel off Start Point, Devon, United Kingdom. Her crew were rescued by Propontis. Hannah Rebecca was on a voyage from Amsterdam, North Holland, Netherlands to a port in Ottoman Syria.

== 7 April ==
List of shipwrecks: 7 April 1852
Ship	State	Description
Antonio	Spain	The ship ran aground and was wrecked between Juist and Norderney, Kingdom of Hanover. Her crew were rescued. She was on a voyage from Havana, Cuba to Hamburg.
Onderneming	Netherlands	The ship, which had sprung a leak on 4 April, was beached near Ørum, Denmark, where she was wrecked. Her crew were rescued. She was on a voyage from Harlingen, Friesland to Danzig.
Tertius	United Kingdom	The ship ran aground on the Bognor Rocks, in the English Channel off the coast of Sussex. She was on a voyage from Portland, Dorset to London. She was refloated and put in to Littlehampton, Sussex in a leaky condition.
Themis	United Kingdom	The ship was driven ashore and severely damaged east of Calais, France. She was on a voyage from Sunderland, County Durham to Mataró, Spain. She wasn refloated on 16 April and taken in to Calais.

== 8 April ==
List of shipwrecks: 8 April 1852
Ship	State	Description
Industry	United Kingdom	The brig was driven ashore and wrecked on Skagen, Denmark. She was on a voyage from Sunderland, County Durham to Stockholm, Sweden.
Wilhelmine	Flag unknown	The ship was driven ashore on Skagen. She was on a voyage from Cette, Hérault, France to Riga, Russia.

== 9 April ==
List of shipwrecks: 9 April 1852
Ship	State	Description
HMS Dido	Royal Navy	The Daphne-class corvette ran aground on the Wellsbank, off Callao, Peru.
Eduard	Elbing	The ship was driven ashore at Dunnet Head, Caithness. She was on a voyage from Liverpool, Lancashire, United Kingdom to Danzig. She was refloated on 19 April and taken in to Scrabster, Caithness.
Elizabeth and Mary	United Kingdom	The ship ran aground on the Black Tail, off the north Kent coast. She was on a voyage from Whitby, Yorkshire to London. She was refloated the next day and resumed her voyage.
Koning Willem II	Netherlands	The ship was destroyed by fire in the Atlantic Ocean. Her crew were rescued by Mathilde (Netherlands). Koning Willem II was on a voyage from Amsterdam, North Holland to Batavia, Netherlands East Indies.
Maria Jane	United Kingdom	The ship ran aground on the Brambles, in the Solent and became waterlogged. She was on a voyage from Cardiff, Glamorgan to Southampton, Hampshire.
Saluda	United States	The steamboat exploded and sank in the Missouri River at Lexington, Missouri. Over 100 people were killed; there were 40–50 survivors.
Sisters	(United Kingdom of Great Britain and Ireland) New Zealand	The brig was wrecked in Poverty Bay. She was on a voyage from Poverty Bay to Wellington.
Undine	United Kingdom	The ship ran aground and was severely damaged at Lytham St. Annes, Lancashire.

== 10 April ==
List of shipwrecks: 10 April 1852
Ship	State	Description
Bells	United Kingdom	The ship ran aground off Harboøre. Denmark. Her crew were rescued. She was on a voyage from Newcastle upon Tyne, Northumberland to Helsingør, Denmark. She was refloated on 23 April and was towed in to Thisted, Denmark by the steamship Odin (Denmark).
Courier	United Kingdom	The steamship ran aground on the Eisenwage. She was on a voyage from Gothenburg, Sweden to Hull, Yorkshire. She was later refloated and resumed her voyage.
I. B. Perry	United States	The schooner struck a sunken wreck and was damaged. She was consequently abandoned on 18 April. She was on a voyage from Philadelphia, Pennsylvania to Falmouth, Cornwall, United Kingdom.
I Know You Don't	(United Kingdom of Great Britain and Ireland) New Zealand	The schooner was wrecked while at dock in Auckland Harbour during a severe gale.
Margaret and Elizabeth	United States	The ship was driven ashore at Ram Head, Georgia. She was on a voyage from Maitland, Florida to Boston, Massachusetts. She was refloated on 24 April.
Queen	United Kingdom	The smack was run down in the Irish Sea off Bray Head, County Wicklow by the steamship Rose. Her crew were rescued. She was on a voyage from Wicklow to Skerries, County Dublin. She was towed in to Kingstown, Count Dublin by Rose.
Shamrock	(United Kingdom of Great Britain and Ireland) New Zealand	The cutter was wrecked while at dock in Auckland Harbour during a severe gale.
Verwachting	Bremen	The ship sank in the North Sea off the Bremen Beacon. She was on a voyage from Sunderland, County Durham, United Kingdom to Vegesack.

== 11 April ==
List of shipwrecks: 11 April 1852
Ship	State	Description
Christina Murray	United Kingdom	The ship was abandoned in the Atlantic Ocean 200 nautical miles (370 km) east of Bermuda. Her crew were rescued by Glencairn (United Kingdom). Christina Murray was on a voyage from Baltimore, Maryland, United States to Liverpool, Lancashire.
Earl of Leicester	United Kingdom	The ship was driven ashore on Skagen, Denmark. She was on a voyage from Messina, Sicily to Saint Petersburg, Russia. She was refloated and taken in to Helsingør, Denmark.
Oak	United Kingdom	The sloop was driven ashore near Margate, Kent. She was on a voyage from Dartmouth, Devon to London. She was refloated and taken in to Margate in a leaky condition.
Paul Bernard	France	The ship was wrecked on "Leon's Island", Argentina. She was on a voyage from Montevideo, Uruguay to Patagonia, Argentina.
Pocohontas	United States	The steamboat was destroyed by fire at Choctaw Bend, in the Mississippi River with the loss of twelve lives. She was on a voyage from Arkansas City, Kansas to New Orleans, Louisiana.
Russell	United Kingdom	The ship ran aground and was damaged at Poole, Dorset. She was on a voyage from Hartlepool, County Durham to Poole.

== 12 April ==
List of shipwrecks: April 1852
Ship	State	Description
Benjamin Parsons	United States	The fishing schooner sank on the Georges Bank in a gale. Lost with all 7 crew.
Isabella	United Kingdom	The ship was severely damaged by fire at Savannah, Georgia, United States.
Jane Hammond	United Kingdom	The ship was destroyed by fire at Savannah.
Johanna Christina	Sweden	The ship was in collision with Cameron (United Kingdom) and sank off Skagen, Denmark. Her crew were rescued by Cameron. Johanna Christina was on a voyage from Ystad to Hull, Yorkshire, United Kingdom.
John	United Kingdom	The ship ran aground at Quegness Point, Sanday, Orkney Islands. She was on a voyage from Hamburg to Quebec City, Province of Canada, British North America. She was refloated and resumed her voyage.
Queen	United Kingdom	The ship was driven ashore and wrecked at Cape Cod, Massachusetts, United States. She was on a voyage from Havana, Cuba to Boston, Massachusetts.
Scotio	United Kingdom	The ship struck a sunken rock off Sumbergh Head, Shetland Islands and was damaged. She was on a voyage from Lerwick, Shetland Islands to the Faroe Islands and Iceland. She put back to Lerwick in a sinking condition.

== 13 April ==
List of shipwrecks: 13 April 1852
Ship	State	Description
Colchester	United Kingdom	The schooner was driven ashore on Deer Island, Massachusetts, United States. All on board were rescued. She was on a voyage from Windsor, Nova Scotia, British North America to Boston, Massachusetts. She became a wreck on 20 April.
Concordia	(United Kingdom of Great Britain and Ireland) Jersey	The ship ran aground on the Calshot Spit, in the Solent. She was on a voyage from Cardiff, Glamorgan to Southampton, Hampshire.
Dart	United Kingdom	The ship was wrecked near Cape Verga, Africa. All on board were rescued. She was on a voyage from Sierra Leone to London.
Mary	(United Kingdom of Great Britain and Ireland) British North America	The ship was wrecked at Cape Ann, Massachusetts. Her crew were rescued.
Mary Hay	United Kingdom	The ship was wrecked on the Bream Ledges, in the Isles of Scilly. She was on a voyage from Jamaica to London.
Sirene	Netherlands	The ship, a barque or a brig, ran aground off Fort Laje, Rio de Janeiro, Brazil with the loss of two or three of her crew. She was on a voyage from Rio de Janeiro to Cowes, Isle of Wight, United Kingdom.

== 14 April ==
List of shipwrecks: 14 April 1852
Ship	State	Description
Advocate	United Kingdom	The ship was driven ashore at Queenstown, County Cork. She was on a voyage from Moulmein, Burma to London. She sank on 17 April.
Breton	France	The lugger ran aground and capsized at Neath, Glamorgan, United Kingdom. She was on a voyage from Pont-l'Abbé, Finistère to Neath.
Duke	United Kingdom	The barque was wrecked on the Wood Cay Reef, off Grand Bahama, Bahamas. Her crew survived. She was on a voyage from Mobile, Alabama, United States to Liverpool, Lancashire.
Liverpool	United Kingdom	The barque was driven ashore on Grand Bahama. She was on a voyage from Salt River, Jamaica to Liverpool. She was later refloated and completed her voyage. She was reported to have been refloated and sailed for a port in the United States, butwith no report of her arrival.
Onyx	United Kingdom	The barque-rigged steamship was abandoned in the Atlantic Ocean. Her crew were rescued by Ellingall (United Kingdom). Onyx was on a voyage from Grangemouth, Stirlingshire to Boston, Massachusetts, United States.
Woodman	United Kingdom	The ship was wrecked off "Milo". Her crew were rescued. She was on a voyage from Troon, Ayrshire to Constantinople, Ottoman Empire.

== 15 April ==
List of shipwrecks: 15 April 1852
Ship	State	Description
Aalborg	Denmark	The schooner was in collision with Mary Lyon (United Kingdom) in the English Channel off Dungeness, Kent, United Kingdom. Four of her seven crew were taken on board Mary Lyon. Aalborg was on a voyage from Newcastle upon Tyne, Northumberland, United Kingdom to Málaga, Spain. She was subsequently taken in to Rye, Sussex, United Kingdom.
Ann	United Kingdom	The ship ran aground on the Pennington Spit, in the Solent. She was refloated and taken in to Portsmouth, Hampshire in a leaky condition.
Deucalion	United Kingdom	The ship was abandoned in the Atlantic Ocean. Her crew were rescued by Nancy and Emma (United Kingdom). Deucalion was on a voyage from London to Boston, Massachusetts, United States.
James Moran	United Kingdom	The ship struck the Lighthouse Rock, off Castletown, Isle of Man. She was refloated.
Tanfield	United Kingdom	The ship was driven ashore at Kronborg, Denmark. She was on a voyage from St. Ubes, Portugal to Saint Petersburg, Russia. She was refloated the next day.
Theodore	United Kingdom	The ship was abandoned in the Atlantic Ocean. Her crew were rescued. She was on a voyage from Dublin to New York, United States.

== 16 April ==
List of shipwrecks: 16 April 1852
Ship	State	Description
Druid	United Kingdom	The schooner was driven ashore at Termonfeckin, County Louth. Her crew were rescued. She was refloated on 18 April and taken in to Drogheda.
Foam	United Kingdom	The ship was abandoned in the Atlantic Ocean. Her crew were rescued. She was on a voyage from Cardiff, Glamorgan to Wilmington, Delaware, United States.
Maria Johanna	Netherlands	The galiot was in collision with the schooner Triton (United Kingdom) and sank in the English Channel off the coast of Dorset, United Kingdom with the loss of four of her seven crew. She was on a voyage from Liverpool, Lancashire to Liebau, Prussia.
Sarah Maria	Kingdom of Hanover	The ship was driven ashore at Peterhead, Aberdeenshire, United Kingdom. She was on a voyage from Norden to Port Gordon, Moray, United Kingdom.
Sisters	(United Kingdom of Great Britain and Ireland) New Zealand	The brig was wrecked at Tūranganui (Gisborne) while leaving port for Napier, when it was caught in a sudden squall. All hands were saved.
Swan	United Kingdom	The smack foundered of Drogheda, County Louth with the loss of all three crew.

== 17 April ==
List of shipwrecks: 17 April 1852
Ship	State	Description
Advocate	United Kingdom	The ship was driven ashore and sank at Robert's Head, County Cork. She was on a voyage from Moulmein, Burma to Queenstown, County Cork.
Arabella	(United Kingdom of Great Britain and Ireland) Jamaica	The schooner was wrecked on the Spanish Main. Her crew survived.
Jane Duffus	United Kingdom	The barque foundered in the Atlantic Ocean 70 nautical miles (130 km) east of Nantucket, Massachusetts, United States. She was on a voyage from Ardrossan, Ayrshire to Boston, Massachusetts, United States.
Renown	United Kingdom	The ship caught fire and was scuttled in the Isles of Scilly. She was on a voyage from Bahia, Brazil to Hamburg.

== 18 April ==
List of shipwrecks: 18 April 1852
Ship	State	Description
Margaret	United Kingdom	The brig was wrecked off Boston, Massachusetts. Her crew were rescued. She was on a voyage from Hartlepool, County Durham to Boston.

== 19 April ==
List of shipwrecks: 19 April 1852
Ship	State	Description
Endeavour	United Kingdom	The ship ran aground on the Shipwash Sand, in the North Sea off the coast of Suffolk and was wrecked. Her crew were rescued by Providence (United Kingdom). Endeavour was on a voyage from Newcastle upon Tyne, Northumberland or Sunderland, County Durham to Maldon, Essex.
Margaret	United Kingdom	The ship was driven ashore on Nauset Beach, Massachusetts. Her crew were rescued. She was on a voyage from Hartlepool, County Durham to Boston, Massachusetts.
Messenger	United Kingdom	The ship was driven ashore at Margate, Kent. She was on a voyage from Dartmouth, Decon to London. She was refloated and resumed her voyage.

== 20 April ==
List of shipwrecks: 20 April 1852
Ship	State	Description
Chalcedony	United Kingdom	The ship was driven ashore at Marshfield, Maine, United States. She was on a voyage from Nova Scotia, British North America to Boston, Massachusetts, United States.
D'Arcy	United Kingdom	The ship ran aground in the River Wear. She was on a voyage from Demerara, British Guiana to Sunderland, County Durham.
Josepha	United Kingdom	The ship, a barque or brig, was driven ashore and wrecked at Truro, Massachusetts, United States with the loss of all but two of her crew and of two rescuers. Survivors were rescued by rocket apparatus. She was on a voyage from Bristol, Gloucestershire to Boston, Massachusetts.
Mary Anne	(United Kingdom of Great Britain and Ireland) British North America	The schooner was wrecked at Point Alderton, New York, United States. All on board were rescued. She was on a voyage from Halifax, Nova Scotia to Boston, Massachusetts.
Town of Liverpool	United Kingdom	The ship ran aground on the Burbo Bank, in Liverpool Bay. She was on a voyage from Buenos Aires, Argentina to Liverpool, Lancashire. She was refloated and towed in to Liverpool in a leaky condition.

== 21 April ==
List of shipwrecks: 21 April 1852
Ship	State	Description
John Wesley	United Kingdom	The schooner was wrecked at "Cabezos". All on board were rescued. She was on a voyage from New Orleans, Louisiana, United States to Veracruz, Mexico.
Malvina	United States	The ship was driven ashore at Bellport, New York. She was on a voyage from Hamburg to New York City.
Orielton	United Kingdom	The schooner was in collision with the steamship Bordeaux (France) and sank off the Goodwin Sands, Kent. Her crew survived. She was on a voyage from Galaţi, Ottoman Empire to Crookhaven, County Cork and Newcastle upon Tyne, Northumberland.
Paulita	Spain	The full-rigged ship was wrecked on Grand Bahama, Bahamas. She was on a voyage from New Orleans, Louisiana, United States to Trieste.

== 22 April ==
List of shipwrecks: 22 April 1852
Ship	State	Description
Grace	United Kingdom	The ship was sunk by ice off Cape Freels, Newfoundland, British North America.
Orielton	United Kingdom	The ship was run down and sunk in The Downs by a French steamship. She was on a voyage from the Danube to London.
Quebec Trader	(United Kingdom of Great Britain and Ireland) British North America	The schooner was abandoned in the Atlantic Ocean. Her crew were rescued by Berlin (Prussia). She was on a voyage from Demerara, British Guiana to Halifax, Nova Scotia.
Scandinavian	United Kingdom	The ship was wrecked on the Monacear Reef, off Malta. She was on a voyage from Alexandria, Egypt to Liverpool, Lancashire.
Seaboat	(United Kingdom of Great Britain and Ireland) British North America	The schooner was destroyed by fire at Saint Thomas, Virgin Islands.
Star	United Kingdom	The ship ran aground in St. Anne's Bay, Jamaica. She was on a voyage from Halifax, Nova Scotia to Jamaica. She was refloated.
Tremlett	United Kingdom	The schooner was driven ashore and wrecked at Manasquan, New Jersey, United States with the loss of seven lives.
Wenlock	United Kingdom	The schooner was driven ashore and wrecked at South Shields, County Durham. She was refloated on 6 May.

== 23 April ==
List of shipwrecks: 23 April 1852
Ship	State	Description
Eduard	Norway	The ship struck the Haisborough Sands, in the North Sea off the coast of Norfolk, United Kingdom and was consequently beached at Sea Palling, Norfolk, where she was wrecked. She was on a voyage from Tønsberg to Rouen, Seine-Inférieure, France.
Emma	Hamburg	The ship was wrecked on North Ronaldsay, Orkney Islands, United Kingdom. She was on a voyage from Hamburg to Newfoundland, British North America.
George	United Kingdom	The ship struck the North Gar Sand, off the mouth of the River Tees and was consequently beached at Seaton Carew, County Durham, where she was wrecked. Her crew were rescued. She was on a voyage from Middlesbrough, Yorkshire to Hamburg.
Robuste	France	The chasse-marée was driven ashore at Wells-next-the-Sea, Norfolk. She was on a voyage from Blyth, Northumberland, United Kingdom to Bayonne, Basses-Pyrénées.
Splendid	United Kingdom	The ship sprang a leak and was beached at Pulteneytown, Caithness, where she became a wreck. Her crew were rescued. She was on a voyage from Newcastle upon Tyne, Northumberland to Drogheda, County Louth. She was refloated on 5 May and taken in to Pultenerytown.

== 24 April ==
List of shipwrecks: 24 April 1852
Ship	State	Description
Anais	France	The ship was in collision with another vessel and sank off Barfleur, Manche. Her crew were rescued. She was on a voyage from Bordeaux, Gironde to Hamburg.
Charles	United Kingdom	The ship ran aground on the Pan Sand, offWhitstable, Kent and was wrecked. All on board were rescued by the smack Nancy (United Kingdom). Charles was on a voyage from Antwerp, Belgium to Montreal and Quebec City, Province of Canada, British North America.
Diligence	United Kingdom	The schooner sank at Broadstairs, Kent.
Rose	United Kingdom	The ship was driven ashore at Dartmouth, Devon. She was refloated and taken in to Dartmouth.
William and Ann	United Kingdom	The ship was driven ashore at Looe, Cornwall. She was refloated and taken in to Looe.

== 25 April ==
List of shipwrecks: 25 April 1852
Ship	State	Description
Betsey and Margaret	United Kingdom	The ship was driven ashore at Sandhaven, Aberdeenshire. She was on a voyage from Arklow, County Wicklow to Newcastle upon Tyne, Northumberland. She was refloated on 4 May and taken in to Fraserburgh, Aberdeenshire for repairs.
Jane	United Kingdom	The barque was abandoned in the Atlantic Ocean. Her crew were rescued. She was on a voyage from Boston, Massachusetts, United States to London.
Lumsden	United Kingdom	The brig ran aground on the Maplin Sand, in the North Sea off the coast of Essex. Her crew were rescued. She was refloated on 1 May. She was on a voyage from Southend, Essex to Newcastle upon Tyne, Northumberland. Lumsden was refloated on 1 May and sailed for London in a leaky condition.
Prairie State	United States	The steamboat suffered a boiler explosion on the Illinois River. Twenty people were killed or injured.
Providentia	Grand Duchy of Mecklenburg-Schwerin	The brig was holed by ice and sank at "Baltic Port". Her crew were rescued.
Rienzi	(United Kingdom of Great Britain and Ireland) New South Wales	The ship was driven ashore on Torrens Island, South Australia. She was on a voyage form Adelaide, South Australia to Sydney. She was refloated.

== 26 April ==
List of shipwrecks: 26 April 1852
Ship	State	Description
Meteor	United States	The steamship was wrecked in Matagorda Bay.

== 27 April ==
List of shipwrecks: 27 April 1852
Ship	State	Description
Enterprise	United Kingdom	The steamship ran aground on the Mappoon Shoals, in the Dardanelles.
Lancier	(flag) France	The ship was wrecked on Halang Island, Netherlands East Indies.
Olive Branch	United Kingdom	The barque was sunk by ice in the Gulf of Saint Lawrence. All on board were rescued by the barque Anthracite (United Kingdom). Olive Branch was on a voyage from Stockton-on-Tees, County Durham to Quebec City, Province of Canada, British North America.

== 28 April ==
List of shipwrecks: 28 April 1852
Ship	State	Description
Ann	United Kingdom	The brig sprang a leak and foundered off the Galloper Sand, in the North Sea of the coast of Essex. Her crew were rescued. She was on a voyage from Newcastle upon Tyne, Northumberland to Folkestone, Kent.
Levant	United Kingdom	The barque was lost in the Mozambique Channel. Her crew were rescued.
Tenasserim	United Kingdom	The steamship ran aground on the Mappoon Shoals, in the Dardanelles.

== 29 April ==
List of shipwrecks: 29 April 1852
Ship	State	Description
Elizabeth	United Kingdom	The schooner sprang a leak and sank at King's Lynn, Norfolk. She was refloated the next day.
Jane	United Kingdom	The ship was run into and sunk in the Atlantic Ocean with the loss of seven of her fourteen crew. Survivors were rescued by Ontario (United Kingdom). Jane was on a voyage from Boston, Massachusetts, United States to London.

== 30 April ==
List of shipwrecks: 30 April 1852
Ship	State	Description
Alabama	United States	The ship ran aground on the Banjaard Sand, in the North Sea off the Dutch coast. She was on a voyage from Baltimore, Maryland to Rotterdam, South Holland, Netherlands. She was refloated and put in to Brouwershaven, Zeeland, Netherlands.
Alice Maud	United Kingdom	The barque was driven ashore near Lydd, Kent. She was on a voyage from Algoa Bay to London. She was refloated with the assistance of the Coast Guard but a boat capsized with the loss of four Coast Guard and two of her crew. Alice Maud was taken in to The Downs.
Juno	Stettin	The ship sank off Bornholm, Denmark. Her crew were rescued. She was on a voyage from Stettin to Riga, Russia.
	United Kingdom	The full-rigged ship was driven ashore on the Isle of Wight, United Kingdom. She was on a voyage from Baltimore, Maryland, United States to Rotterdam, South Holland.
Lady Cornwall	United Kingdom	The barque was driven ashore at Équihen, Pas-de-Calais, France. She was on a voyage from Bahia, Brazil to Bremen.
Nederwaard	Netherlands	The ship ran aground on the Goodwin Sands, Kent, United Kingdom. She was on a voyage from Batavia, Netherlands East Indies to Rotterdam, South Holland, Netherlands. She was refloatea and taken to the North Foreland, Kent.
Sussex	United Kingdom	The ship departed from San Francisco, California, United States for Hong Kong. No further trace, presumed foundered with the loss of all hands.
Walton	United Kingdom	The ship was driven ashore at Point Lornel, Pas-de-Calais. She was on a voyage from Punta Arenas, Chile to London. She was refloated on 3 May and taken in to Boulogne, Pas-de-Calais.
Winfield Scott	United States	The paddle steamer was damaged by fire at San Francisco, California. She was on a voyage from Panama City, Republic of New Granada to San Francisco.

== Unknown date ==
List of shipwrecks: Unknown date in April 1852
Ship	State	Description
A. M. Uniacke	United Kingdom	The schooner was wrecked near Lunenburg, Nova Scotia, British North America before 7 April.
Apollo	United Kingdom	The barque was driven ashore on the Isla de Juventud, Cuba between 1 and 24 April. She was on a voyage from Cienfuegos, Cuba to London.
Bee	United Kingdom	The sloop was driven ashore near Wexford. She was on a voyage from Liverpool, Lancashire to Waterford.
Benjamin Parsons	United States	The fishing schooner was lost on the Georges Bank in a gale. Lost with all 7 hands.
Boundary	United States	The schooner was driven ashore at Cape Cod, Massachusetts before 24 April.
Chickasaw	United States	The steamboat was in collision with the steamboat W. B. Clifton (United States) and sank in the Ohio River with the loss of twenty lives.
Colonia	Denmark	The brig foundered in the Atlantic Ocean off Cape Cod before 7 April. She was on a voyage from Livorno, Grand Duchy of Tuscany to Boston, Massachusetts.
Coquette	United Kingdom	The ship was damaged by fire at Messina, Sicily.
Kate	(United Kingdom of Great Britain and Ireland) British North America	The ship was abandoned in the Atlantic Ocean 40 nautical miles (74 km) east of George's Bank by nineteen of her 23 crew. She was on a voyage from Saint John, New Brunswick to Liverpool, Lancashire. Kate was subsequently towed in to New York, United States.
Leonidas	Greece	The brig was wrecked at "Lubina", Ottoman Empire between 19 and 26 April. She was on a voyage from Constantinople to Galaţi.
Madeleine	France	The ship ran aground off "Île Learch-vue", Ille-et-Vilaine and capsized. She was on a voyage from Dieppe, Seine-Inférieure to Sunderland, County Durham, United Kingdom. She was righted and beached near Saint-Malo.
Maria Grace	United Kingdom	The ship was sunk by ice at Cape Freels, Newfoundland, British North America before 12 April.
Mary	United Kingdom	The ship was driven ashore on the Isla de Juventud, Cuba. She was on a voyage from Newcastle upon Tyne, Northumberland to Havana, Cuba.
Melrose	United Kingdom	The brig was abandoned in the Atlantic Ocean before 5 April.
Napolion	United States	The fishing schooner was lost on the Georges Bank in a gale. Lost with all 8 hands.
Prairie State	United Kingdom	The steamboat suffered a boiler explosion, caught fire and sank in the Illinois River with the loss of more than twenty lives.
Progress	United Kingdom	The ship ran aground at New Orleans, Louisiana, United States before 14 April. She was on a voyage from New Orleans to Liverpool.
Sjaardema	Netherlands	The ship was wrecked at Benicarló, Spain before 30 April.
