= Bagansiapiapi =

- Special Economic Zone

Other transcription(s)
  - Jawi: باڬن سياڤي-اڤي
  - Mandarin: 峇眼亚比 (Simplified) 峇眼亞比 (Traditional); Bāyǎn yǎbǐ (Pinyin)
  - Hokkien: 峇眼 (Hanzi); Bā-gán (Pe̍h-ōe-jī)
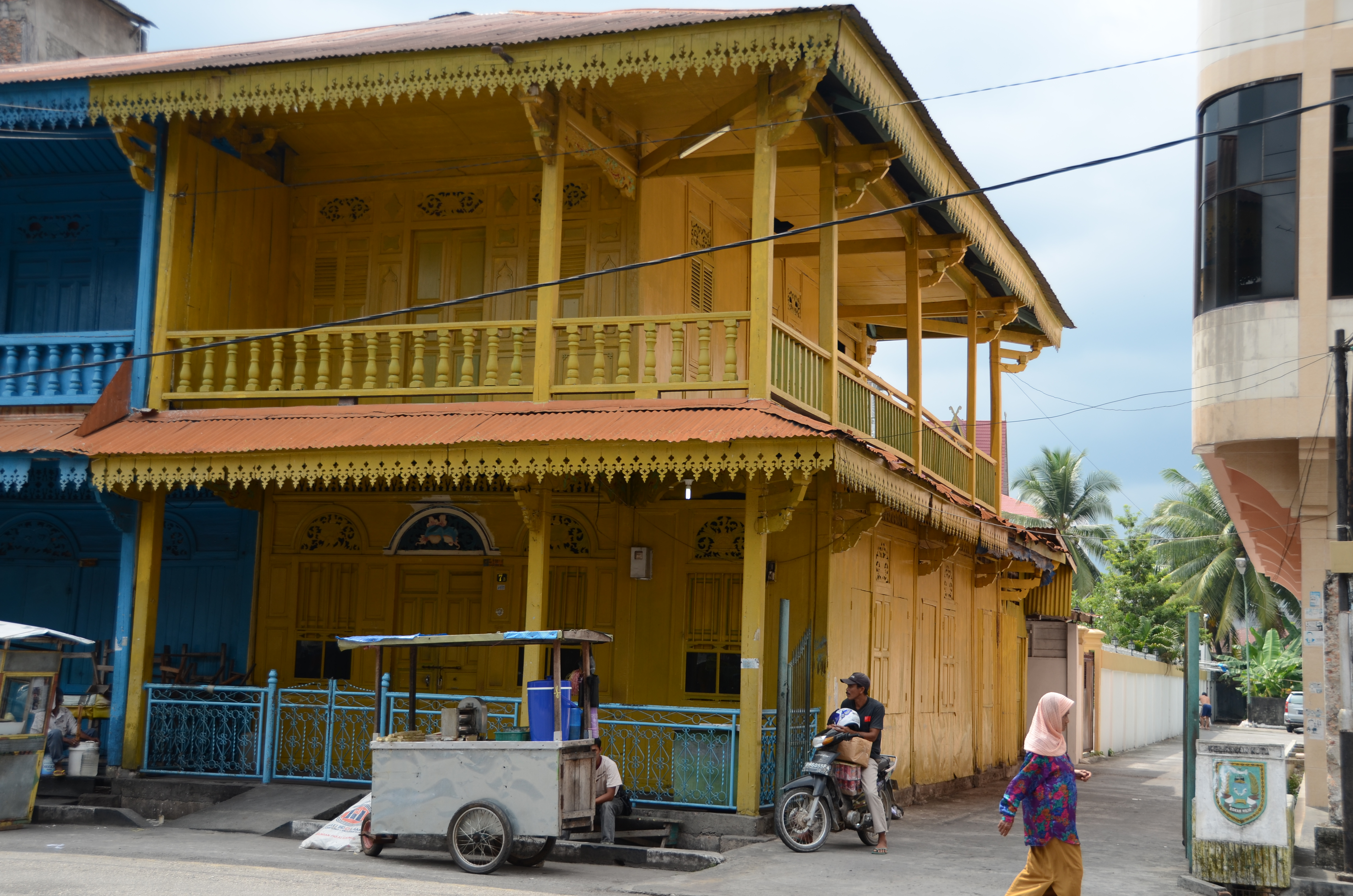
- Old peranakan-styled houses in downtown of Bagansiapiapi

- Location within Riau Location within Sumatra Location within Indonesia
- Coordinates: 2°10′N 100°49′E
- Country: Indonesia
- Province: Riau
- Regency: Rokan Hilir
- Established: 1800s

Government

Area.
  - Total: 475.26 km^{2} (183.50 sq mi)

Population (30 June 2013)
  - Total: 73,360
  - Density: 154/km^{2} (400/sq mi)
- Demonym: Bagan-kia (峇眼人)
- Time zone: UTC+7 (WIB)
  - Summer (DST): Not observed
- Website: Bagansiapiapi Community website

Bagansiapiapi
- Traditional Chinese: 峇眼亞比
- Simplified Chinese: 峇眼亚比
Transcriptions
Standard Mandarin
- Hanyu Pinyin: Bāyǎn yǎbǐ
Yue: Cantonese
- Jyutping: baa1 ngaan5 aa3 bei3
Southern Min
- Hokkien POJ: Bā-gán-a-pī

Bagan
- Chinese: 峇眼
Transcriptions
Standard Mandarin
- Hanyu Pinyin: Bāyǎn
Southern Min
- Hokkien POJ: Bā-gán

Bagansiapiapi or simply known as Bagan (Chinese: 峇眼; Pe̍h-ōe-jī: Bā-gán) is a city in Riau province on the island of Sumatra, Indonesia. The city is the capital of Rokan Hilir Regency in the province and is located on the east coast of Sumatra, on the Rokan River delta across the strait west of Malacca and near Dumai.

== History ==
The town was originally populated mainly by Chinese immigrants who arrived at the end of 18th and the beginning of 19th century. Initially eighteen Chinese nationals sailed to Bagansiapiapi around 200 years ago and settled on the delta. All were from the family named (Ang;Chinese: 洪) . in other dialects). More followed, searching for a new life and seeking to avoid the economic hardships prevalent in Hokkien (China) at that time.

Every year, the Chinese community celebrates the anniversary of Bagansiapiapi, on the 16th day, of the 5th month of the Lunar year, believing that the initial immigrant group landed at Bagansiapiapi on that day.

Most of the Chinese population are Hokkien, originating from Tâng-Oann 同安(TongAn, now part of ē-Mn̂g 廈門Xiamen), Kim-Mn̂g 金門 (Kinmen, Quemoy, JinMen), and Chìn-Kang 晉江(JinJiang/Jinjiang). Some Teochew, living mainly in the southern part, and a minority of Khek/Hakka also populated the town. Most of Chinese population communicate using the Tâng-Oann dialect of Hokkien.

Bagansiapiapi was one of the largest fish producers in the world during the late 1980s and early 1990s, ranking second in the world. Bagansiapiapi is also famous for swallow nest farming. Indonesia's bird's nests are famous for their quality and are well liked by consumers. This industry has led Bagansiapiapi into a new era of economic growth, involving investment, high activity in building construction and export growth.

In recent years, urbanization has been an issue. Most of the youth leave the town after high school to pursue a better life, or higher education in larger cities. They normally return for the traditional family reunion during the Chinese New Year celebrations.

=== Fishing Town ===
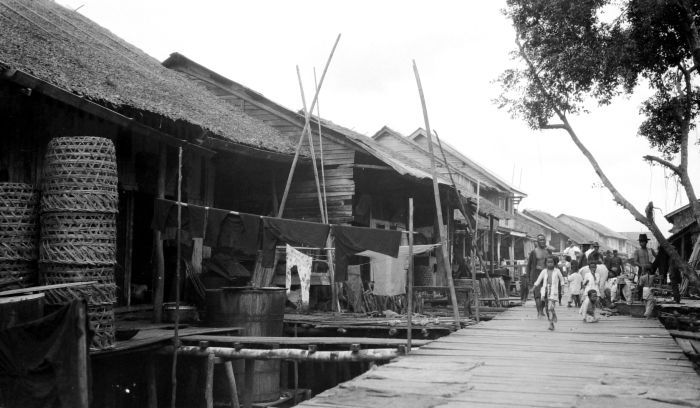
The Chinese fishing village, with wooden road on poles of 1200 meters long and 3 meters wide, taken around 19th century

In the 1980s Bagansiapiapi was one of the largest fish producing towns in Indonesia, and the second highest producer of fish in the world, after Bergen in Norway.

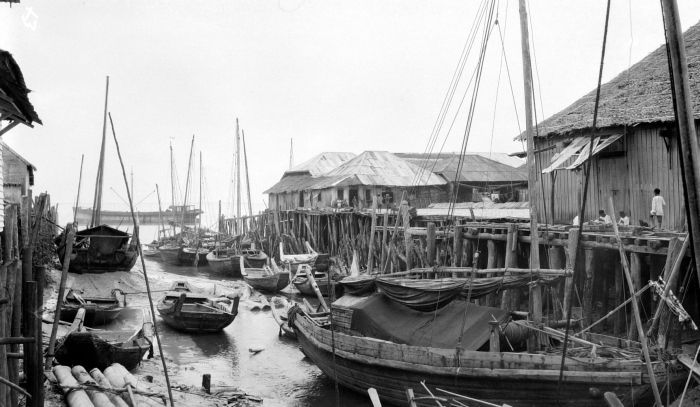
The main fishing port in Bagansiapiapi, the town was developed rapidly around 1900, thanks to the richness of fish and shrimps from the sea around the area, Strait Malacca. A large part of the catch was shipped to Singapore and Batavia in the form of dried fish and trasi (terasi, a strong smelling ingredient of various Indian foodstuffs). (P. Boomgaard, 2001)

In its development, the fishing industry has made Bagansiapiapi into a modern town. In 1934, Bagansiapiapi already had a drinking water treatment facility, a power plant and a firefighter unit. Due to the town's progress compared to other areas of afdeeling in Bengkalis, Bagansiapiapi was called as Ville Lumiere or (City of Light). The fishing industry started with the first wave of Chinese immigrants, attracted to the area by the availability of abundant fishing. The town's heyday came under the jurisdiction of the Dutch East Indies, around 1930, when the fisheries produced 300,000 tons of fish per year. The annual production has fallen since, being particularly affected by a collapse of fish numbers since the 1970s, by which time over 800 trawlers based in the town were fishing the Shunda Shelf. The trawling ban in Indonesian waters, introduced in 1980, has had a significant effect on the economy of the town.

However, the nickname Bagansiapiapi as a fish town over time are faded. If previously natural factors that make it so known as a fish producer, later it is known that natural factors are also causing the fading gradually because the coast around Bagansiapiapi experience siltation and narrow by the sediment of mud brought water Rokan River. Bagansiapiapi was also famous as the largest traditional shipyard in Indonesia before independence. Bagansiapiapi's made boats are capable of penetrating various types of marine characteristics so that they are also used in Java, Nusa Tenggara, and Maluku. Outside the country, his work attracted fishermen in Sri Lanka, India, even America.

Bagansiapiapi boats production meet demand from the smallest of about three-four tons to 300 tons. Shipyards mushroomed in the era of the 1940s until the mid-1980s. In its heyday, the name of Bagansiapiapi was more famous than Pekanbaru and Riau Province. But now the business is dead and suspended because of the limitations of wood raw materials and a series of Act About Forestry. The law states that the central government has full authority to determine the division of forest areas. As a result, the locally dominated wood-searchers, no longer able to cut timber to sell it to shipyard entrepreneurs.

== Demographics ==
At the 2013 census, the population of Bagansiapiapi city was 73,360. Majority ethnic group of the city are the Chinese with large minority Malay population, while the Minangkabau and Batak are the remainder.

Ethnicities of Bagansiapiapi - 2000 Census
| ethnic group | percent |
| Chinese | 59.55% |
| Malay | 34.10% |
| Minangkabau | 3.20% |
| Batak | 2.25% |
| Other | 0.75% |

As for Religion, Buddhism and Chinese religion (including Taoism and Confucianism) are the major religions in the city, while Islam and Christianity are minority religions.

Though Indonesian is the official language, Hokkien is the most spoken language in Bagansiapiapi, due to the large Chinese population. The variety they use belong to the same language as Taiwanese Hokkien, namely a variety called as Bagan Hokkien (Chinese: 峇眼福建話; Pe̍h-ōe-jī: bā gán hok-kiàn-oā). Another local language is Malay, spoken by the Malay community.

== Barge Burning festival ==
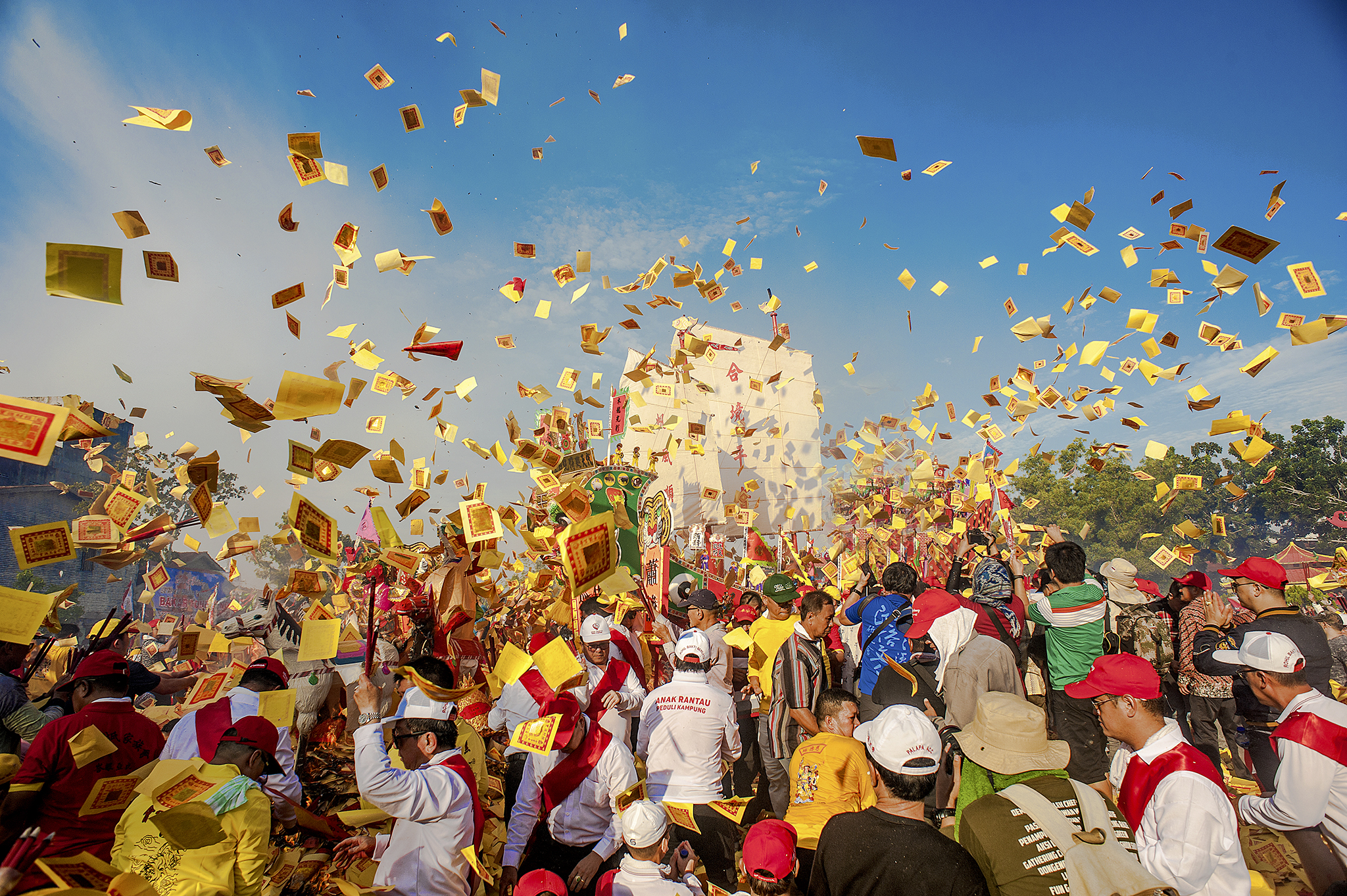
Bakar Tongkang Festival

Barge burning, locally known as Bakar Tongkang (Chinese: 儀式 燃料 的 駁船) or in Hokkien language known as Go Gwek Cap Lak (Chinese: : 五月 十六 日) is an annual Bagansiapiapi peoples ritual especially among the ethnic Chinese celebrated every 16th in the fifth month of the Chinese calendar. Each year, the ritual brings in tourists from Malaysia, Singapore, Thailand, Taiwan, and mainland China to Bagansiapiapi. This annual event is now heavily promoted by the government as a source of Rokan Hilir tourism.

== Transportation ==
Transportation has been an area of concern for the government, as there is currently no airport. Bagansiapiapi is reached by road, being some 4-5 hours from Pekanbaru, capital of Riau, and 2.5 hours from Dumai. From North Sumatra and Medan the travel time by road is about 11 hours.

The local government has an ongoing policy of improving the town infrastructure, including the widening of roads and improving street lighting.

== Places around Bagansiapiapi ==
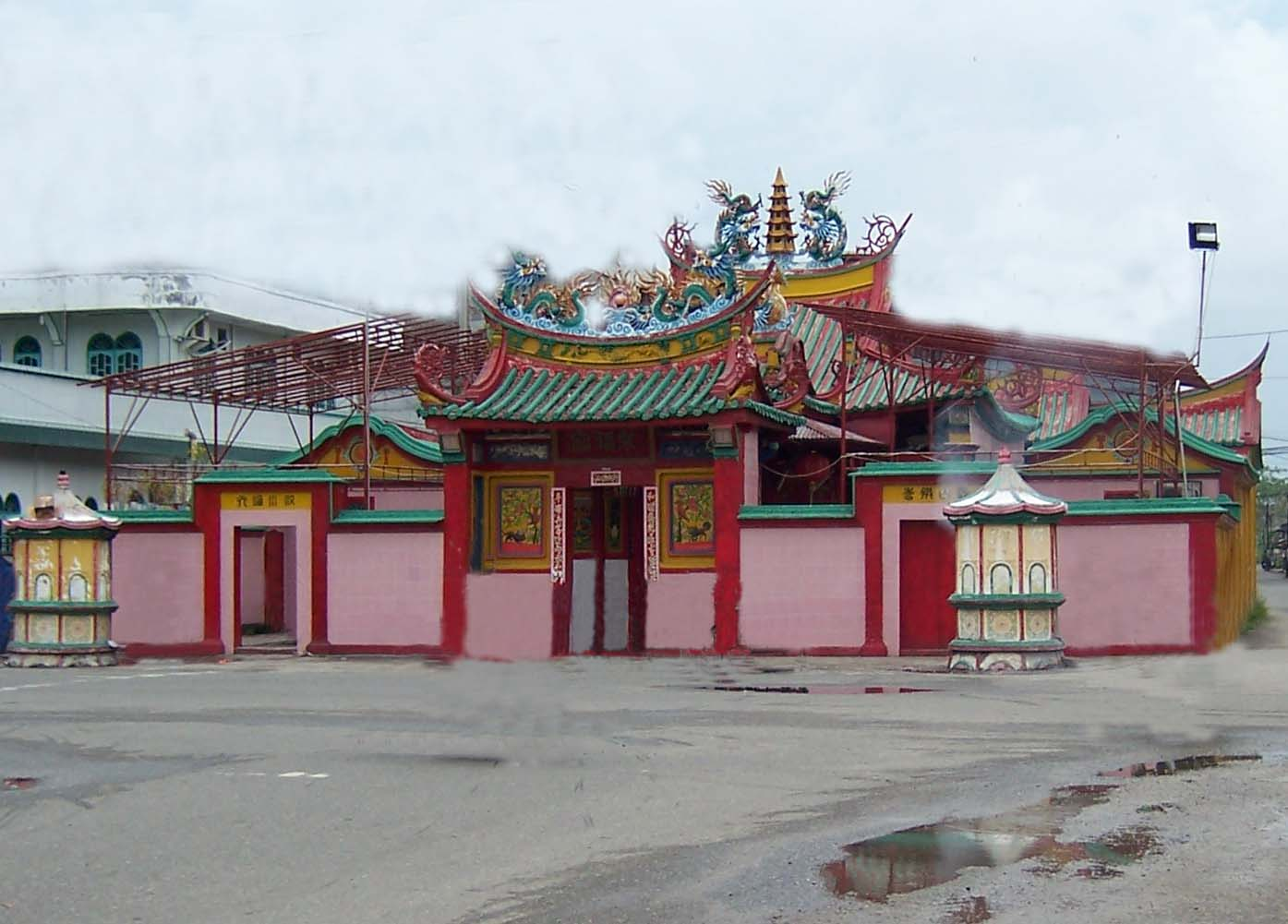
Ing Hok Kiong temple

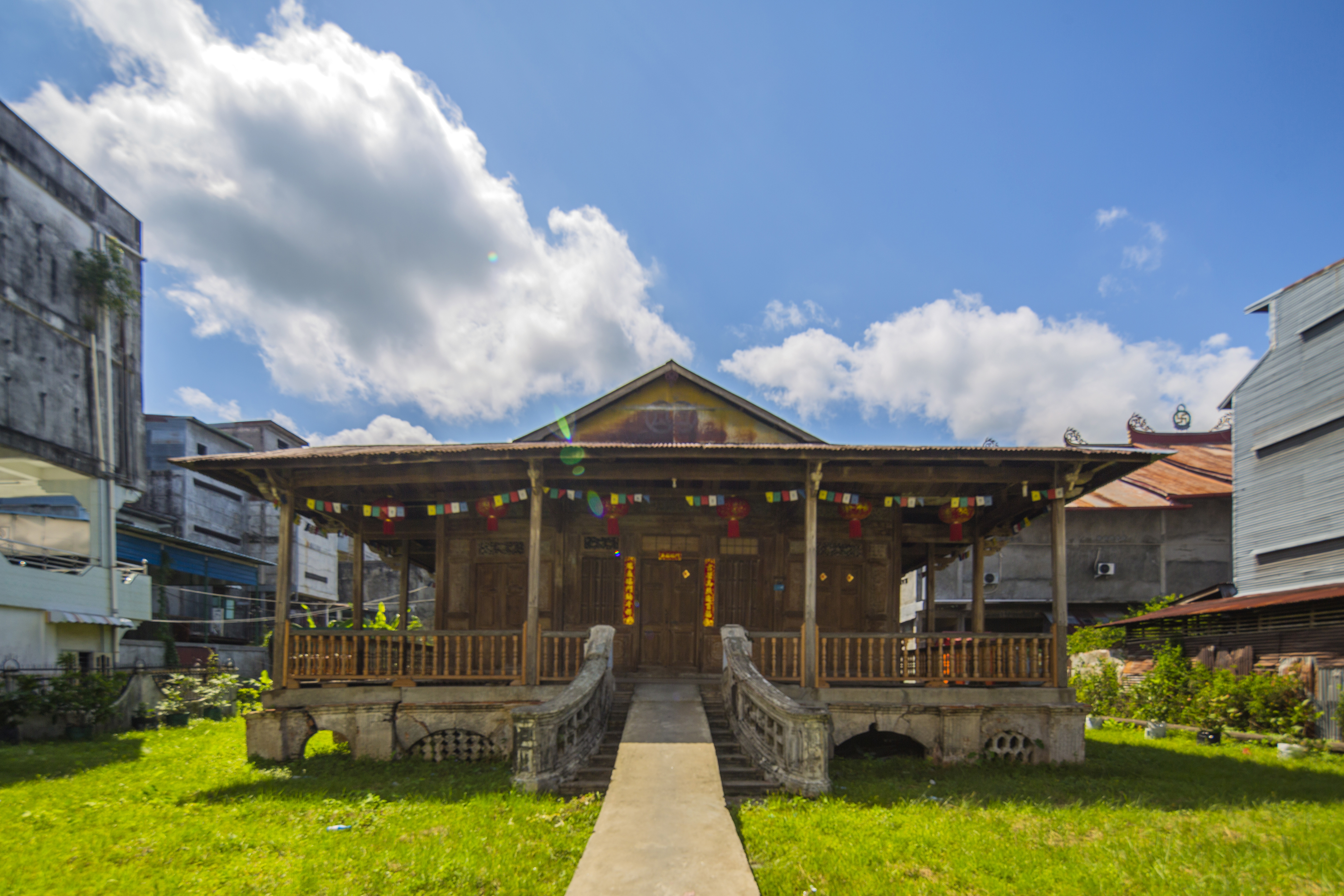
An old Bagansiapiapi Kapitan house

- Ing Hok Kiong Temple (永福宮)
- Jemur Island (Pak-ku) 北龜
- Sinaboi (Chiann-chui-kang; 正水港)
- Panipahan (Li-pa-ham : 籬笆蚶)
- Kubu
- Tanah Putih
- Sungai Nyamuk (Tua-kang 大港)
- Pulau Halang (Si-Kak-Pa; 四角笆)
- Pulau Berkley
- Ujung Simbul (Chhau-Ta-Pa; 臭乾笆)
- Sungai Bakau (Tua-Pa 大笆)

== See also ==
- Chinese Indonesian
- Riau
- Rokan Hilir
- Sinaboi
- Panipahan
- Pulau Jemur
