= Panipahan =

Coordinates: 2°28′01″N 100°20′24″E

Panipahan 黎巴汉
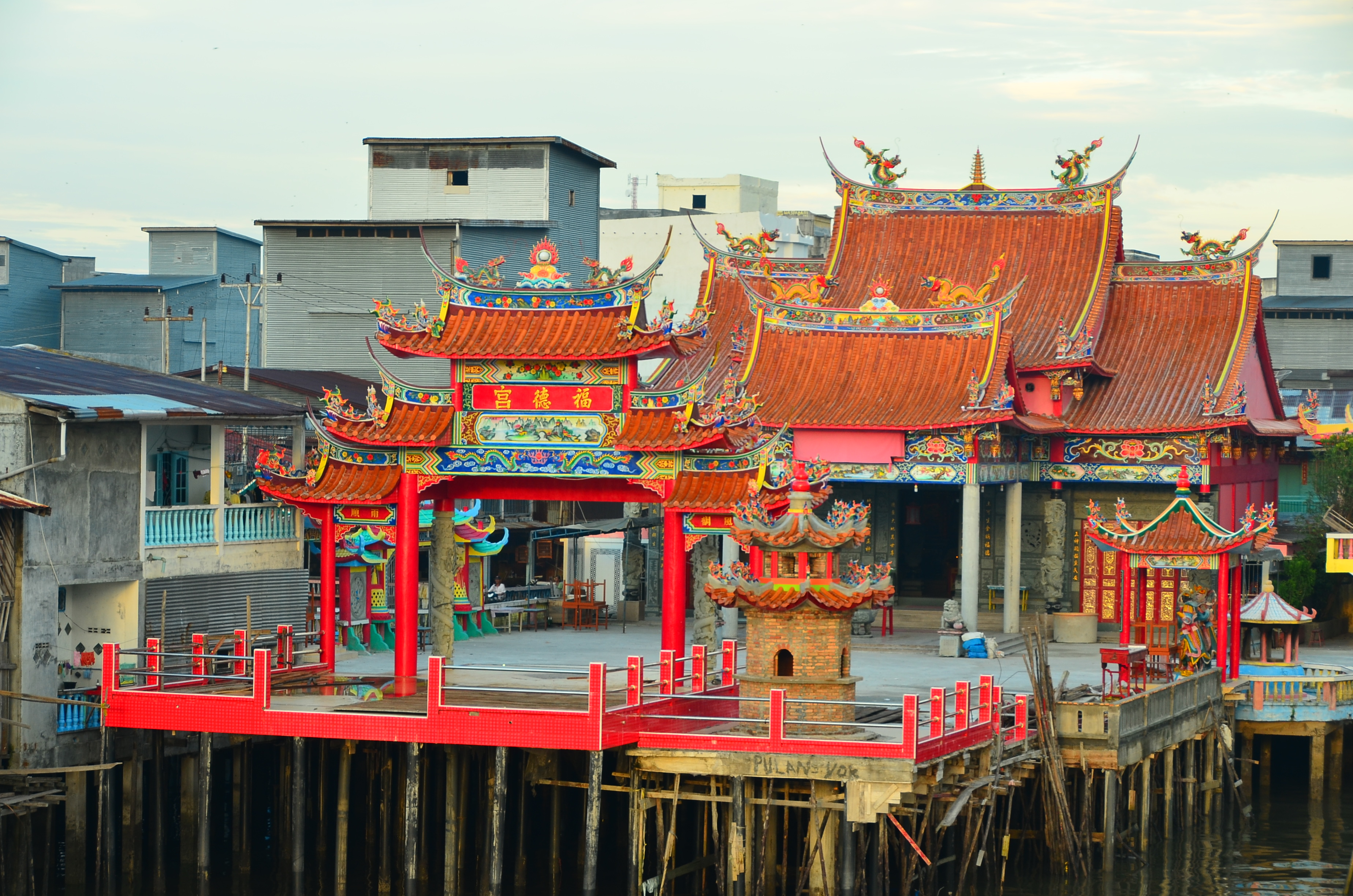
- Hock Tek Keng Temple in Panipahan
- Nickname: Li-Pa Ham
- Interactive map of Panipahan 黎巴汉
- Country: Indonesia
- Province of Indonesia: Riau
- Time zone: UTC+7 (WIB)
  - Summer (DST): Not observed
- Website: [http://www.rokanhilir.go.id/ Rokan Hilir Regency

Panipahan is a small town near Bagansiapiapi, Riau Province, Indonesia, 35 Miles northwest from Bagansiapiapi. Panipahan can be reached from Bagansiapiapi (1.5 hours by boat) and from Tanjung Balai Asahan (2.5 hours by boat)
