= FV Emmy Rose =

History
- Name: Miss Elizabeth III (1987–1994); Miss Monica (1994–1995); Virgin Steel (1995–1997); Miss Elizabeth III (1997–2001); Sasha Lee (2001–2020); Emmy Rose (2020–2020)
- Owner: Boat Aaron & Melissa Inc
- Operator: Boat Aaron & Melissa Inc
- Port of registry: Portland, Maine, United States
- Route: Gulf of Maine to Gloucester, Massachusetts
- Builder: Tommy Nguyen shipyard, New Iberia, Louisiana
- Yard number: 10
- In service: 1987
- Out of service: 23 November 2020
- Identification: Call sign: WDA3394; IMO number: 8854988; MMSI number: 366797960
- Fate: Sank with all hands on 23 November 2020

General characteristics
- Type: Fishing vessel
- Tonnage: 116 GRT
- Length: 82.0 ft (25.0 m)
- Beam: 75 ft (22.9 m)
- Draft: 9.1 ft (2.8 m) est.
- Decks: 3
- Installed power: Caterpillar 3412 diesel engine producing 1 × 630 hp (470 kW)
- Propulsion: Single shaft
- Crew: 4

FV Emmy Rose was a United States-flagged commercial fishing vessel built in 1987 by the Tommy Nguyen shipyard in New Iberia, Louisiana. Originally built as a shrimp trawler named Miss Elizabeth III, she would go through several name changes during her lifespan. In 1994, she was renamed Miss Monica, then Virgin Steel in 1995, and subsequently renamed back to Miss Elizabeth III in 1997. In January 2001, she was renamed Sasha Lee and had her homeport changed to New Bedford, Massachusetts. Finally, on 6 May 2020, the vessel was purchased by Boat Aaron & Melissa Inc and renamed Emmy Rose.

On 23 November 2020, the vessel sank while returning from the Gulf of Maine to Gloucester, Massachusetts after a 5-day fishing voyage. At 01:29, the United States Coast Guard received a distress signal from Emmy Rose's EPIRB, but no distress signal from the vessel's crew was ever received. When search and rescue staff arrived at the location of the EPIRB transmission, they began their efforts, which continued for 38 hours and covered over 2,200 square miles (5,700 km^{2}). In the midst of the search, they recovered debris that consisted of a life preserver, an empty life raft, the EPIRB itself and two wooden hatch covers for the vessel's fish hold. None of the four crewmembers on board were found.

== Background ==
Emmy Rose was built at the Tommy Nguyen shipyard in New Iberia, Louisiana in 1987 as a shrimp trawler under the name Miss Elizabeth III, being hull number 10. She would don this name until 1994, when her name was changed to Miss Monica.

In 1995, the vessel underwent another name change. This time, she was renamed Virgin Steel, which would be the name of the vessel until 1997, when she was renamed back to her original name.

In January 2001, the vessel was sold to Sasha Lee Inc. and was renamed Sasha Lee. Her homeport was changed to New Bedford, Massachusetts as well. As a result of this change, the vessel was converted into a stern trawling vessel. Two steel net drums that were 7 feet (2.1 m) in diameter were installed on the stern along with the walkways on both the port and starboard side of the vessel being closed off. Another modification that was done was the extension of the bulwark on the aft deck, which was done to provide the crewmembers with protection from the elements.

Over the years, more changes were done to the vessel, which included the diameter of the net reels being extended for the usage of larger nets. Two bins that were filled with fishing equipment were added to the top deck. Lastly, the other recorded changes include the addition of another cargo boom and more rigging and fishing gear being stored on the vessel's working deck.

=== Arrest of Carlos Rafael ===
Main page: Carlos Rafael

In February 2016, Carlos Rafael, the owner of Sasha Lee Inc. and nine other fishing companies was arrested by federal agents and, in May, was charged on 27 counts, including but not limited to: conspiracy, cash smuggling and falsifying federal records. Rafael later plead guilty in March 2017 and was sentenced to 46 months in prison.

In a notice sent to the email addresses of Carlos Rafael's companies on 10 January 2018, its stated that Sasha Lee Inc. used Sasha Lee to violate the Magnuson-Stevens Act. The company also received a notice of the vessel's permit, Greater Atlantic Federal Permit 330795 being subject to revocation.

On August 19, 2019, NOAA fisheries announced the settlement agreement between Rafael and the federal government, which stated that Rafael was forced to sell his fishing vessels and permits by 31 December 2020. He also had to permanently suspend all commercial fishing operations, with the exception of scalloping, by 31 December 2019. By 31 March 2020 Rafael had to permanently cease all scalloping operations as well.
