= MV Stellar Banner =

South Korean ore carrier ship

History
- Name: Stellar Banner
- Owner: VP-12 Shipping, Inc.
- Operator: Polaris Shipping Co., Ltd., Seoul, South Korea
- Port of registry: Majuro, Marshall Islands
- Ordered: 18 December 2013
- Builder: Hyundai Heavy Industries Group, Gunsan, South Korea
- Yard number: 2745
- Laid down: 28 December 2015
- Launched: 15 April 2016
- Completed: 20 June 2016
- In service: 2016–2020
- Identification: IMO number: 9726803; MMSI number: 538006941; Call sign: V7TC5
- Fate: Ran aground 24 February 2020; Scuttled 12 June 2020

General characteristics
- Type: Very large ore carrier
- Tonnage: 151,596 GT; 50,544 NT; 300,660 DWT
- Displacement: 338,505 t (333,159 long tons)
- Length: 340 m (1,120 ft)
- Beam: 55 m (180 ft)
- Height: 64.77 m (212 ft)
- Draft: 21.423 m (70 ft)
- Depth: 29 m (95 ft)
- Installed power: MAN B&W 6G80ME-C9; 22,748 kW (30,506 hp)
- Propulsion: Single shaft; fixed pitch propeller
- Speed: 14.85 knots (27.50 km/h; 17.09 mph)
- Capacity: 7 cargo holds; 168,522 m^{3} (5,951,300 cu ft)

Stellar Banner was a Marshallese very large ore carrier (VLOC) managed by the South Korean company Polaris Shipping. Constructed in 2016, she suffered significant damage in a grounding incident in 2020 and was scuttled. At the time, she was the largest ship ever scuttled.

== Construction and career history ==
Stellar Banner was a very large ore carrier constructed at Gunsan, South Korea, by Hyundai Heavy Industries Group in 2016. Registered in the Republic of the Marshall Islands, she was named Stallar and Hyundai Gunsan 2745 before being renamed Stellar Banner.

== Loss ==
Stellar Banner departed Ponta da Madeira, Brazil, bound for Qingdao, China, on 24 February 2020 with a cargo of 294,871 tonnes of iron ore. Her captain decided to deviate from his planned route during Stellar Banner′s outbound transit of Baía de São Marcos and pass within 1 nautical mile (1.9 km; 1.2 mi) of a 20-metre (66 ft) shoal in an area in which the nautical charts aboard Stellar Banner provided only limited hydrographic information. Her hull struck bottom and she suffered heavy bow damage. which caused flooding in many voids and water ballast tanks.

Stellar Banner anchored, and her crew assessed the damage and tried to control the flooding with fixed and portable pumps. After several hours, the crew determined that sea water was flooding the ship more quickly than the pumps could pump it out. The captain then moved Stellar Banner to shallower water and intentionally ran her aground about 100 kilometres (54 nmi; 62 mi) off São Luís, Brazil, on the morning of 25 February 2020 to prevent her from sinking. She took on a heavy list to starboard after grounding. Her crew of 20 was evacuated safely.

In March, a salvage effort began in which salvors first removed 3,500 tonnes of fuel oil and 140 tonnes of diesel fuel from the ship; a process that took about a month and was completed on 12 April. Shortly afterwards, the lightering of the ship's cargo of iron ore began. Sources differ on the amount of iron ore removed, one stating that by 27 May, salvors had lightered about 145,000 tonnes of iron ore, and another that 140,000 tonnes had been removed when lightering concluded on 2 June. According to the Brazilian Navy, lightering and other measures reduced Stellar Banner′s list from 25 to 13 degrees.

Stellar Banner was refloated on 3 June and was immediately towed to deeper water and anchored. There her ship classification society, Korean Register of Shipping, assisted by commercial divers and a remotely operated underwater vehicle team, conducted a damage survey, which determined that she was a constructive total loss. The ship's scrap value alone probably totaled several million US dollars and about 150,000 tonnes of iron ore remained aboard, but Polaris Shipping, citing unacceptable safety issues, apparently determined that the cost of bringing the ship to port to unload her remaining cargo and sell her for scrap would exceed the value of the ship and her cargo and proposed scuttling in deep water instead.

The Brazilian Navy concluded that the iron ore, navigation equipment and basic machinery remaining aboard posed no threat to marine life or the environment and approved the scuttling plan. After the removal of all floating objects, mooring lines, and oil and oily residue left aboard, Stellar Banner was scuttled with about 145,000-150,000 tonnes of iron ore still aboard on 12 June in more than 2,700 metres of water about 80nm off Maranhão, Brazil. Fountains of red iron ore sprayed into the air as she sank, and her funnel detached from her superstructure, then resurfaced and drifted for approximately a minute before also sinking.}} The anchor handling tug supply vessel Bear, the supply vessel Normand Installer, a Brazilian Navy patrol vessel, and an oil spill response vessel stood by as she was scuttled. At the time, she was reportedly the largest ship ever scuttled.

During the weekend of 12–14 June, a Poseidon aircraft conducted overflights of the area of the sinking and found no evidence of escaping oil, according to the Brazilian Navy. The oil spill response vessel Água Marinha and the ocean support vessel Iguatemi also monitored the area for 72 hours after Stellar Banner sank.

== Investigation ==
On 26 October 2021, the Maritime Administrator of the Republic of the Marshall Islands published a casualty investigation report on the loss of Stellar Banner. The report concluded that the most significant cause of the accident was the ship's deviation from her planned route when transiting the Baía de São Marcos, and pointed also to deficiencies in on-board management and in the information available on nautical charts.
