= Sinaboi =

Coordinates: 2°17′N 101°02′E

Sinaboi 讲水港
- Nickname: Cia Cui Kang
- Interactive map of Sinaboi 讲水港
- Country: Indonesia
- Province of Indonesia: Riau
- Time zone: UTC+7 (WIB)
  - Summer (DST): Not observed
- Website: [http://www.rokanhilir.go.id/ Rokan Hilir Regency

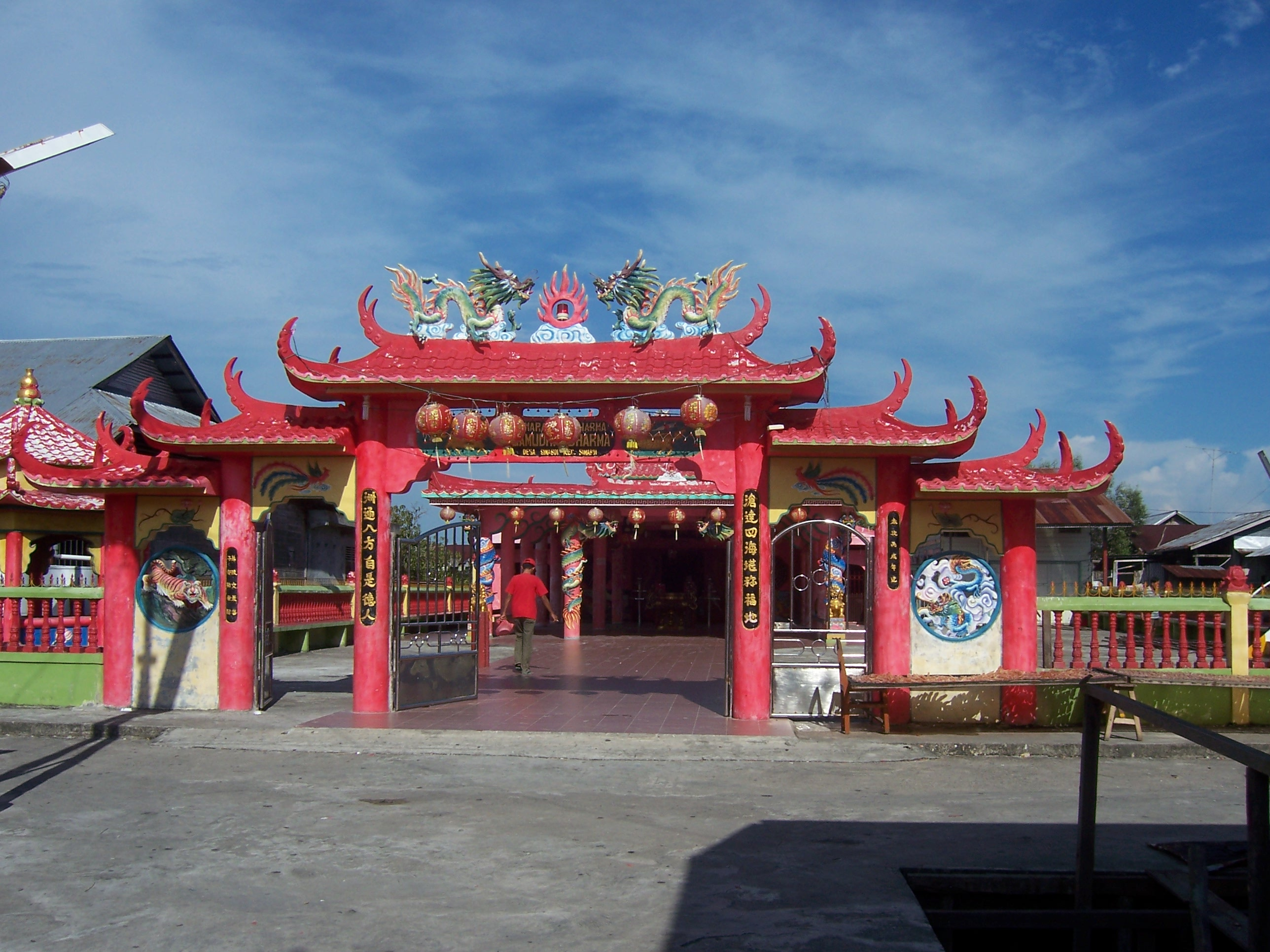
Chinese Temple in Sinaboi

Sinaboi is a fishing village and district (kecamatan) in Rokan Hilir Regency, Riau, Indonesia. It is about 30 km east of Bagansiapiapi and about 30 km from Dumai.

The majority of Sinaboi villagers are ethnic Chinese. In Hokkian language, it is called Cia Cui Kang.

The village had a population of 2,329 according to the official estimates as at mid 2023, while the district had 21,780 inhabitants according to the official estimates as at mid 2024.
