= Rokan River =

Coordinates: 2.0°N 100.86667°E

Rokan River Sungai Rokan, Soengai Rekan
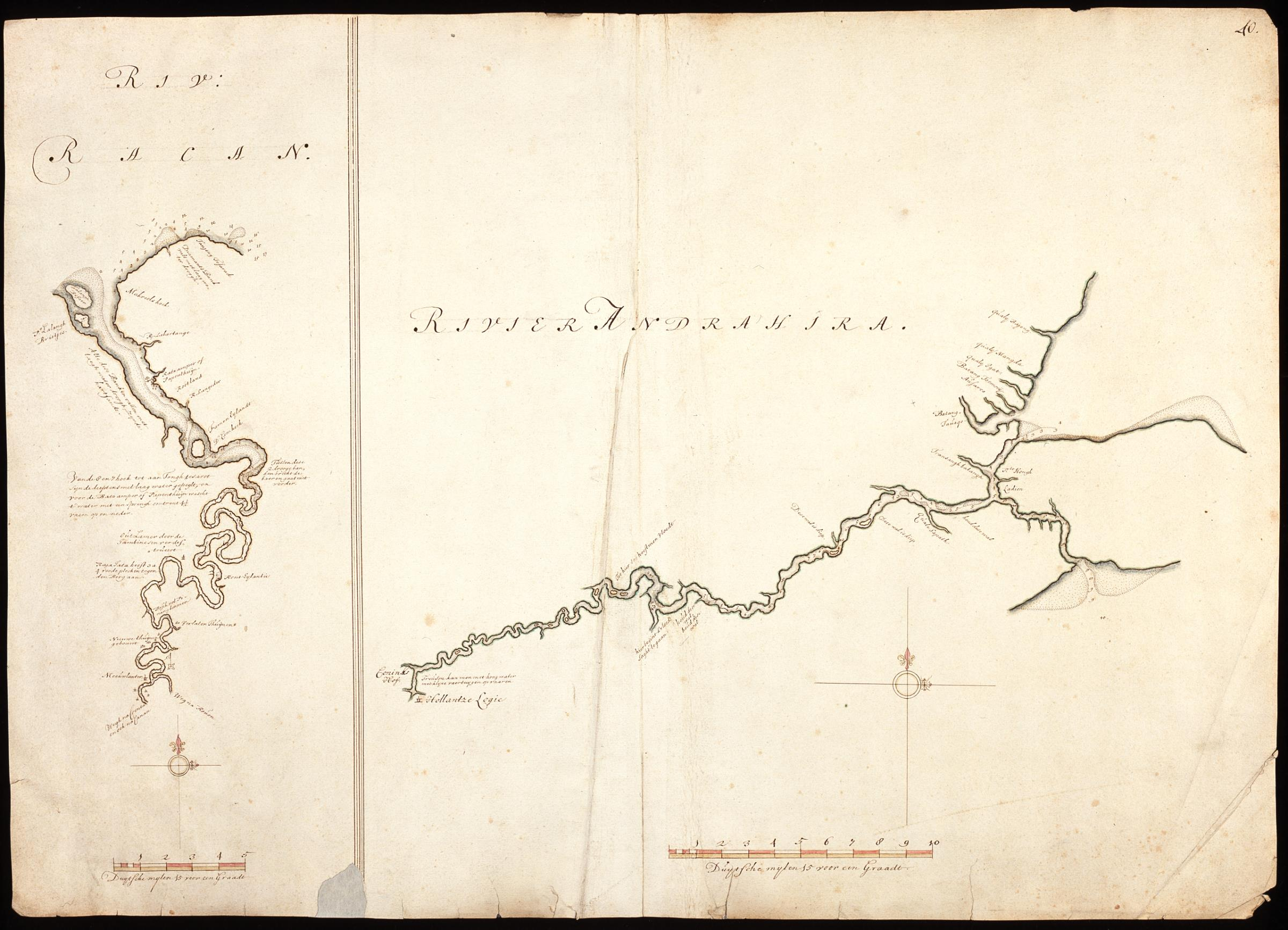
- Map of the Rokan (left) and Indragiri rivers by Isaak de Graaf, circa 1690-1743.

- Location of river mouth Rokan River (Indonesia)

Location
- Country: Indonesia
- Province: Riau

Physical characteristics
- Source
  - location: Barisan Mountains
- Mouth
  - location: Malacca Strait
- Length: 350 km (220 mi)
- Basin size: 19,258 km^{2} (7,436 mi^{2})
- Discharge
  - location: Rokan Delta, Bagansiapiapi, Malacca Strait
  - average: (Period of data: 2009–2013)1,506 m^{3}/s (53,200 cu ft/s)

Basin features
- Tributaries
  - left: Rokan-kanan River
  - right: Rokan-kiri River

Rokan River is a river in Riau province, central-eastern Sumatra, Indonesia, about 1,100 km northwest of the capital Jakarta.

== Hydrology ==
The river originates in the Barisan Mountains in the west, and drains northeast-ward along Rokan Hulu Regency and Rokan Hilir Regency with estuarine located near the port town of Bagansiapiapi draining the water to Malacca Strait.

Tributaries include the Rokan-kiri River, Rokan-kanan River, Kumu River.

== Geography ==
The river flows in the central area of Sumatra with predominantly tropical rainforest climate (designated as Af in the Köppen-Geiger climate classification). The annual average temperature in the area is 23 °C. The warmest month is March, when the average temperature is around 24 °C, and the coldest is January, at 22 °C. The average annual rainfall is 3766 mm. The wettest month is November, with an average of 336 mm rainfall, and the driest is July, with 113 mm rainfall.

== See also ==
- List of drainage basins of Indonesia
- List of rivers of Indonesia
- List of rivers of Sumatra
