= Rokan Hilir Regency =

Regency in Riau, Indonesia

Coordinates: 2.1660°N 100.8251°E

Rokan Hilir Regency Kabupaten Rokan Hilir
- Regency
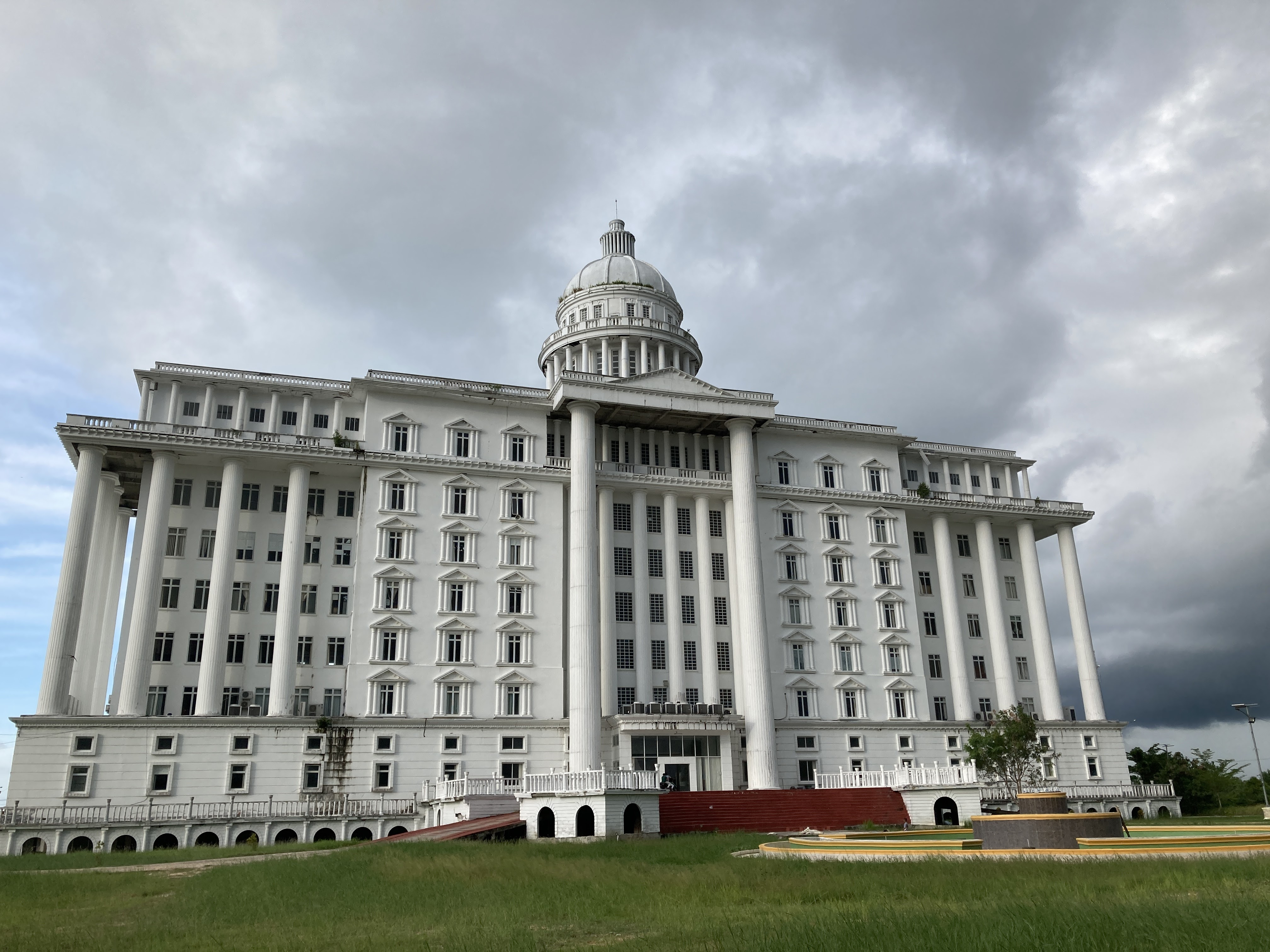
- Regency office of Rokan Hilir Regency in Bagansiapiapi

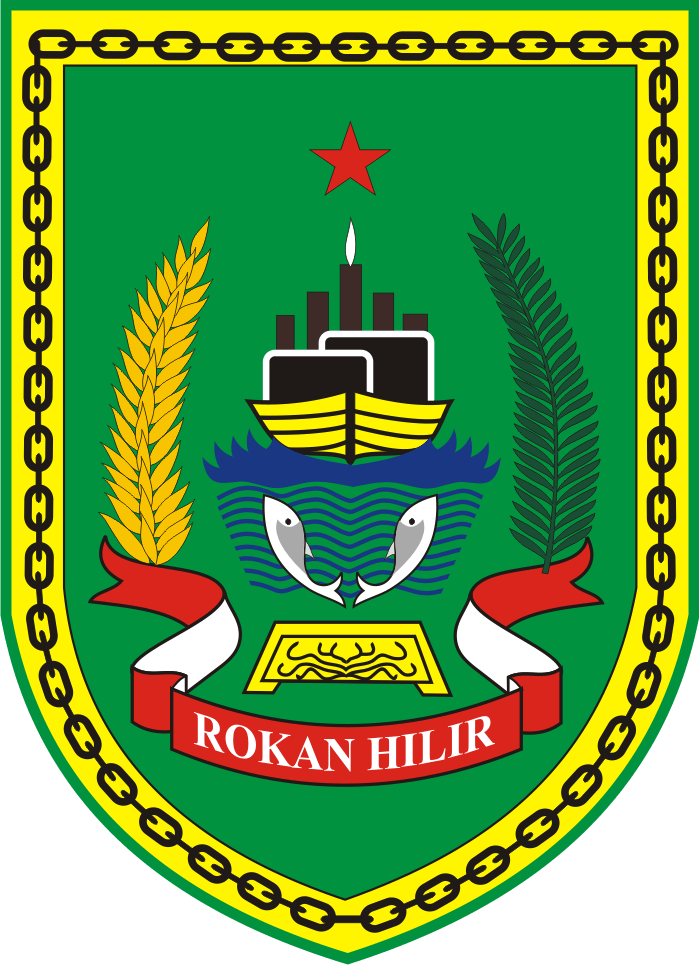
- Coat of arms

- Country: Indonesia
- Province: Riau
- Regency seat: Bagansiapiapi

Government
  - Regent: Bistamam
  - Vice Regent: Jhony Charles

Area
  - Total: 9,068.63 km^{2} (3,501.42 sq mi)

Population (mid 2024 estimate)
  - Total: 688,073
  - Density: 75.8740/km^{2} (196.513/sq mi)
- Time zone: UTC+7 (WIB)
- Website: rohikab.go.id

Rokan Hilir ("Lower Rokan") is a regency (kabupaten) of Riau Province, on Sumatra island, Indonesia. It was formed on 4 October 1999 from districts which had previously been the northwestern part of Bengkalis Regency. It occupies the lower part of the catchment area of the Rokan River, and has an area of 9,068.63 km^{2}. It had a population of 553,216 at the 2010 census and 637,161 at the 2020 census; the official estimate as at mid 2024 was 688,073 (comprising 352,235 males and 335,838 females). The administrative centre of the Rokan Hilir Regency is located at the town of Bagansiapiapi.

== Administrative districts ==
As at 2010, the regency was divided into thirteen districts (kecamatan), but two additional districts (Kubu Babusalam and Pekaitan) were created by splitting of the Kubu and Bangko districts respectively; and more recently three more districts (Tanjung Medan, Bagan Sinembah Raya and Balai Jaya) were added by splitting of the Pujud and Bagan Sinembah districts respectively. The eighteen districts are listed below with their areas and populations at the 2010 census and the 2020 census, together with the official estimates as at mid 2024. The table also includes the locations of the district administrative centres, the number of administrative villages in each district (a total of 159 rural desa and 25 urban kelurahan), and its post code.

Kode Wilayah	Name of District (kecamatan)	Area in km^{2}	Pop'n census 2010	Pop'n census 2020	Pop'n estimate mid 2024	Admin Centre	No. of villages	Post code
14.07.03	Tanah Putih	1,284.24	57,638	69,150	78,086	Sedinginan	17 ^{(a)}	28985
14.07.08	Pujud	889.12	63,861	33,954	35,979	Pujud	11 ^{(b)}	28983
14.07.09	Tanah Putih Tanjung Melawan	391.41	12,066	14,628	16,824	Melayu Besar	6 ^{(b)}	28986
14.07.13	Rantau Kopar	150.14	5,636	6,592	7,052	Rantau Kopar	4 ^{(c)}	28984
14.07.16	Tanjung Medan	545.13	^{(d)}	36,282	39,283	Tanjung Medan	12	28983
14.07.05	Bagan Sinembah	170.29	131,862	69,825	70,290	Bagan Batu	13 ^{(c)}	28992
14.07.11	Simpang Kanan	305.11	25,865	24,821	26,236	Simpang Kanan	6 ^{(b)}	28994
14.07.17	Bagan Sinembah Raya	365.73	^{(e)}	20,150	22,700	Bagan Sinembah Raya	10 ^{(b)}	28992
14.07.18	Balai Jaya	611.10	^{(e)}	53,404	55,359	Balai Jaya	11 ^{(c)}	28992
14.07.01	Kubu	392.22	38,329	25,616	29,490	Teluk Merbau	10 ^{(b)}	28991
14.07.06	Pasir Limau Kapas	585.52	33,405	37,258	40,331	Panipahan	8 ^{(b)}	28995
14.07.15	Kubu Babussalam	488.97	^{(f)}	23,836	26,179	Rantau Panjang Kiri	12	28990
14.07.02	Bangko	572.74	81,984	78,742	83,351	Bagansiapiapi	15 ^{(h)}	28911 -28914
14.07.07	Sinaboi	357.19	11,081	18,373	21,780	Sinaboi	6 ^{(b)}	28914
14.07.12	Batu Hampar	225.67	7,213	9,448	10,111	Batayan	5 ^{(b)}	28912
14.07.14	Pekaitan	414.27	^{(g)}	15,858	17,459	Pedamaran	10	28913
14.07.04	Rimba Melintang	349.39	32,162	37,624	40,679	Rimba Melintang	12 ^{(b)}	28953
14.07.10	Bangko Pusako	970.39	52,114	61,600	66,884	Bangko Kanan	16 ^{(c)}	28993
	Totals	9,068.63	553,216	637,161	688,073	Bagansiapiapi	184	

Notes: (a) including 3 kelurahan. (b) including one kelurahan. (c) including 2 kelurahan.
(d) the 2010 population of the new Tanjung Medan District is included in the figures for Pujud District, from which it was cut.
(e) the 2010 populations of the new Bagan Sinembah Raya District and Balai Jaya District are included in the figures for Bagan Sinembah District, from which they were cut.
(f) the 2010 population of Kubu Babassalam District is included in the population figure for Kubu District, from which it was cut.
(g) the 2010 population of Pekaitan District is included in the population figure for Bangko District, from which it was cut. (h) including 5 kelurahan.

== Towns with significant populations ==
- Bagansiapiapi
- Bagan Batu
- Panipahan
- Ujung Tanjung
- Pulau Halang
