= Halang Island =

Island in Riau Province, Indonesia

Pulau Halang
Pulau Halang
- Interactive map of Pulau Halang

Geography
- Location: Kubu, Rokan Hilir, Riau, Indonesia
- Coordinates: 2.19°N 100.66°E

Halang Island or Pulau Halang (Indonesian: Pulau Halang, literally "obstructing island"), is an island in Rokan Hilir, Riau, Indonesia. It has two fishing villages; Front Island (Pulau Halang Depan) and Back Island (Pulau Halang Belakang), both mostly inhabited by Hokkien people who originated from Cin-kang Fujian Province in China. It is located in the mouth of Delta Rokan River. Pulau Halang can be reached from Bagansiapiapi by speedboat in about one hour.

== Festival ==
There are two annual festivals each year: one the 18th of the fourth month on Front Island, and another on the 16th of the sixth month on Behind Island (Chinese Lunar calendar).

== Transportation ==
Motorcycles are the main method of transportation in Pulau Halang.
