= List of equipment of the Venezuelan Armed Forces =

This is a list of equipment used by the Venezuelan Armed Forces.

== Army ==
=== Armoured fighting vehicles ===
Model	Image	Origin	Quantity	Details
Main battle tanks
T-72B1		USSR	92	
AMX-30V		France	81	
Light tanks
AMX-13		France	31	
Reconnaissance
Dragoon 300 LFV2		Venezuela	42	
Scorpion-90		United Kingdom	87	
V-150		United States	79	
V-100		United States	79	
Infantry fighting vehicles
BMP-3		Russia	123	Including variants.
BTR-80A		Russia	114	Including variants.
Armored personnel carriers
Dragoon 300		United States	36	

=== Engineering and maintenance vehicles ===
Model	Image	Origin	Quantity	Notes
ARV
BREM-L		Russia	n/a	
AMX-30D		France	3	
BREM-1		USSR	n/a	
Dragoon 300RV		United States	2	
Samson		United Kingdom	n/a	
VLB
Leguan		Germany	n/a	

=== NBC vehicles ===
Model	Image	Origin	Quantity	Notes
NBC vehicles
TPz-1 Fuchs NBC		Germany	10	

=== Anti-tank/anti-infrastructure ===
Model	Image	Origin	Caliber	Quantity	Notes
Anti-tank guided missiles
IMI MAPATS		Israel	n/a	n/a	
Recoilless rifles
M40A1		United States	106mm	175	
Guns • SP
M18 Hellcat		United States	76mm	75	

=== Artillery ===
Model	Image	Origin	Caliber	Quantity	Notes
Self-propelled artillery
2S19 Msta-S		Russia	152mm	48	
Towed artillery
M114A1		United States	155mm	12	
M101A1		United States	105mm	40	
Model 56		Italy	105mm	40	
Multiple rocket launchers
9A52 Smerch		Russia	300mm	12	
LAR-160		Israel	160mm	20	
BM-21 Grad		Russia	122mm	24	
GUN/MOR
2S23 NONA-SVK		Russia	120mm	13	
SP 81mm
Dragoon 300PM		United States	81mm	21	
AMX-VTT		France	81mm	n/a	
Mortars
2S12		USSR	120mm	24	
Brandt		France	120mm	60	
n/a		n/a	81mm	165	

=== Aircraft ===
Model	Image	Origin	Quantity	Notes
TPT • Light
M-28 Skytruck		Poland	11	
IAI-202 Arava		Israel	2	
IAI-201 Arava		Israel	1	
Beech 300 King Air		United States	1	
Cessna 207 Stationair		United States	2	
Beech 200 King Air		United States	1	
Beech 90 King Air		United States	1	
Cessna 206		United States	2	
Cessna 182 Skylane		United States	6	
Cessna 172		United States	1	

=== Helicopters ===
Model	Image	Origin	Quantity	Notes
ATK
Mi-35M2 Hind		Russia	9	
MRH
Mi-17V-5 Hip H		Russia	19	
Bell 412EP		United States	10	
Bell 412SP		United States	2	
TPT • Heavy
Mi-26T2 Halo		Russia	3	
TPT • Medium
AS-61D		United States	2	
TPT • Light
Bell 206L3 Long Ranger II		United States	1	
Bell 206B Jet Ranger		United States	3	

== Air Defence Command (CODAI) ==
=== Air defence ===
Model	Image	Origin	Quantity	Notes
Surface-to-air missiles
Long-range
S-300VM		Russia	12	
Medium-range
9K317M2 Buk-M2E		Russia	9	
S-125 Pechora-2M		Russia	44	
Point-defence
RBS-70		Sweden	n/a	
Mistral		France	n/a	
9K338 Igla-S		Russia	n/a	
ADAMS		n/a	n/a	
Guns
SP
AMX-13 Rafaga		France	6+	
M42		United States	6	
Towed
L/70		Sweden	114+	
M1		United States	some	
n/a		n/a	n/a	
ZU23-2		USSR	ε200	
TCM-20		United States	114+	

== National Guard (Fuerzas Armadas de Cooperacion) ==
=== Armoured fighting vehicles ===
Model	Image	Origin	Quantity	Notes
Armoured personnel carriers (T)
AMX-VCI		France	25	
AMX-PC		France	12	(CP).
AMX-VCTB		France	8	(Amb).
Armoured personnel carriers (W)
Fiat 6614		Italy	24	
UR-416		Germany	20	
AUV
VN4		China	121	

=== Artillery ===
Model	Image	Origin	Caliber	Quantity	Notes
Mortars
n/a		n/a	81mm	50	

=== Patrol and coastal combatants ===
Model	Image	Origin	Quantity	Note
PB
Protector		n/a	12	
Punta		n/a	12	
Rio Orinoco II		n/a	10	

=== Aircraft ===
Model	Image	Origin	Quantity	Notes
TPT • Light
M-28 Skytruck		Poland	12	
IAI-201 Arava		Israel	1	
Beech 200C King Air		United States	1	
Beech 90 King Air		United States	1	
Beech 80 Queen Air		United States	1	
Beech 55 Baron		United States	1	
DA42 MPP		Austria	6	
Cessna U206 Stationair		United States	4	
Cessna 402C		United States	2	
Cessna 172		United States	2	
Cessna 152 Aerobat		United States	3	
TRG
PZL M26 Iskierka		Poland	2	

=== Helicopters ===
Model	Image	Origin	Quantity	Notes
MRH
Mi-17V-5 Hip H		Russia	5	
Bell 412EP		United States	8	
TPT • Light
AW109		Italy	4	
AS355F Ecureuil II		France	9	
Bell 212		United States	1	(AB 212).
Bell 206L LongRanger		United States	4	
Bell 206B JetRanger		United States	4	
TRG
F-280C		United States	5	

== Navy ==
=== Submarines ===
Class	Image	Ships	Origin	Tonnage	Note
Submarines
Type 209		S-31 Sábalo	Germany	1,810t	SSK 1 Sabalo (in refit; 1 more non-operational) (GER T-209/1300) with 8 single 533mm TT with SST-4 HWT.

=== Principal surface combatants ===
Class	Image	Ships	Origin	Tonnage	Note
Frigates
Lupo-class		F-22 Almirante Brion n/a	Italy	2,506t	Both with ITA Lupo mod, (1 more non-operational) with 8 single lnchr with Otomat Mk2 AShM, 2 triple 324mm ASTT with A244 LWT, 1 127mm gun (capacity 1 Bell 212).

=== Patrol and coastal combatants ===
Class	Image	Ships	Origin	Tonnage	Note
FSGH / PSOH
Guaiquerí-class		PC-21 Guaiquerí; PC-23 Yekuana; PC-24 Kariña	Spain	2,419t	2 Guaiqueri with 2 quadruple lnchr with CM-90 AShM, 2 triple 324mm ASTT with A244 LWT, 1 76mm gun. 1 Guaiqueri with 1 Millennium CIWS, 1 76mm gun.
PBG / PB
Constitución-class		PC-11 Constitución; PC-12 Federación; PC-13 Independencia; PC-14 Libertad; PC-15 Patria; PC-16 Victoria	United Kingdom	173t	3 PBGs (UK Vosper 37m) with 2 single lnchr with Otomat Mk2 AShM. And 3 PBs (UK Vosper 37m) with 1 76mm gun.
PBFG / PBF
Peykaap III-class		n/a n/a n/a n/a	Iran	13,75t	4+ Peykaap III (IPS-16 mod) with 2 single lnchr with CM-90 AShM.

=== Amphibious ===
Class	Image	Ships	Origin	Tonnage	Note
Landing Ships
Capana-class		T-62 Esequibo; T-63 Goajira; T-64 Los Llanos	South Korea	~1,625t	3 Capana LSTs (ROK Alligator) capacity 12 tanks; 200 troops) (one more non-operational).
Landing Craft
n/a		n/a n/a	n/a	n/a	Margarita (river comd).
Griffon 2000		n/a	n/a	n/a	1 Griffon 2000TD.

=== Logistics And Support ===
Class	Image	Ships	Origin	Tonnage	Note
AGOR
Punta Brava-class		BO-11 Punta Brava	Spain	1,180t	
AGS
n/a		n/a n/a	n/a	n/a	2 Gabriela.
AKR
Los Frailes-class		T-91 Los Frailes; T-92 Los Testigos; T-93 Los Roques; T-94 Los Monjes	Netherlands	~722t	
AORH
Ciudad Bolívar-class		T-81 Ciudad Bolívar	South Korea	n/a	
ATF
n/a		n/a	Netherlands	n/a	1 Almirante Franciso de Miranda (Damen Salvage Tug 6014).
AXS
Simón Bolívar-class		BE-11 Simón Bolívar	Spain	1260t	

=== Aircraft ===
Model	Image	Origin	Quantity	Notes
MP
C-212-200 MPA		Spain	2	Combat capable.
TPT • Light
C-212 Aviocar		Spain	4	
Beech 200 King Air		United States	1	
Beech C90 King Air		United States	1	
Turbo Commander 980C		United States	1	

=== Helicopters ===
Model	Image	Origin	Quantity	Notes
ASW
Bell 212 ASW		United States	4	AB-212 ASW.
MRH
Mi-17V-5 Hip H		Russia	6	
Bell 412EP Twin Huey		United States	6	
TPT • Light
Bell 206B Jet Ranger II		United States	1	
TRG
TH-57A Sea Ranger		United States	1	

== Marines ==
=== Armoured fighting vehicles ===
Model	Image	Origin	Quantity	Details
LT TK
VN-16		China	10	
Infantry fighting vehicles
VN-1		China	11	
VN-18		China	10	
Armoured personnel carriers (W)
EE-11 Urutu		Brazil	37	
AAV
LVTP-7		United States	11	

=== Engineering and maintenance vehicles ===
Model	Image	Origin	Quantity	Details
ARV
VS-25		China	1	
AEV
AAVR7		United States	1	

=== Anti-tank/anti-infrastructure ===
Model	Image	Origin	Caliber	Quantity	Details
Recoilless rifles
M40A1		United States	106mm	n/a	
Carl Gustaf		Sweden	84mm	n/a	

=== Artillery ===
Model	Image	Origin	Caliber	Quantity	Details
Towed
M-56		Yugoslavia	105mm	18	
Multiple rocket launchers
Fajr-1		iran	107mm	ε10	
MOR
Brandt		France	120mm	12	

=== Patrol and coastal combatants ===
Model	Image	Origin	Quantity	Details
PBR
Constancia		n/a	18	
Manaure		n/a	2	
Terepaima		n/a	3	(Cougar).

=== Amphibious ===
Model	Image	Origin	Quantity	Details
Landing craft
LCU
n/a		n/a	1	
LCM
n/a		n/a	1	
LCVP
n/a		n/a	12	

== Coast Guard ==
=== Patrol and coastal combatants ===
Class	Image	Ships	Origin	Tonnage	Note
PSO
Guaicamacuto-class		GC-21 Guaicamacuto; GC-22 Yavire; GC-24 Comandante eterno Hugo Chávez	Spain	1,453t	3 Guaicamacuto with 1 Millennium CIWS, 1 76mm gun (capacity 1 Bell 212 (AB-212) hel).
PB
Point-class		PG-31 Petrel; PG-32 Alcatraz; PG-33 Albatros; PG-34 Pelicano	United States	~65t	
Damen Stan Patrol 4207		PG-61 Fernando Gómez de Saa	Netherlands; Venezuela	n/a	
Damen Stan Patrol 2606		PG-51 Pegalo; PG-52 Caricare; PG-53 Alcaraván	Netherlands; Venezuela	n/a	
n/a		n/a	n/a	n/a	12 Gavion.
n/a		n/a	n/a	n/a	2 Protector.

=== Logistics and support ===
Class	Image	Ships	Origin	Tonnage	Note
AG
n/a		n/a	n/a	n/a	1 Los Taques (salvage ship).
AKL
n/a		n/a	n/a	n/a	1 Ship.
AP
n/a		n/a	n/a	n/a	2 Ships.

== Air Force ==
=== Aircraft ===
Model	Image	Origin	Quantity	Details
FTR
F-16B Fighting Falcon		United States	3	(of which 2†).
F-16A Fighting Falcon		United States	15	(of which 12†).
FGA
Su-30MKV Flanker		Russia	21	(of which 12†).
EW
Falcon 20DC		United States	2	
SA-227 Metro III		United States	2	C-26B.
TKR
KC-137		United States	1	
TPT • Medium
C-130H Hercules		United States	5	Some in store.
Y-8		China	8	
G-222		Italy	1	
TPT • Light
Short 360 Sherpa		United Kingdom	2	
Cessna 750 Citation X		United States	1	
Cessna 551		United States	1	
Cessna 550 Citation II		United States	3	
Cessna 500 Citation I		United States	1	
Cessna 208B Caravan		United States	4	
Cessna 206 Stationair		United States	12	
Cessna 182N Skylane		United States	10	
Beech 350 King Air		United States	2	
Beech 200 King Air		United States	6	
Do-228-212NG		Germany	1	
Do-228-212		Germany	2	
Quad City Challenger II		United States	11	
PAX
A319CJ		European Union	1	
B-737		United States	1	
Falcon 900		France	2	
Falcon 20F		France	1	
TRG
K-8W Karakorum		China	23	
SF-260E		Italy	12	
EMB-312 Tucano		Brazil	19	
DA42VI		Austria	6	
DA40NG		Austria	24	

=== Helicopters ===
Model	Image	Origin	Quantity	Details
MRH
Mi-17VS Hip H		Russia	8	
TPT • Medium
Mi-172		Russia	2	VIP.
AS532UL Cougar		European Union	2	
AS532 Cougar		European Union	7	
AS332B Super Puma		European Union	3	
TPT • Light
Enstrom 480B		United States	7+	

=== Unmanned aerial vehicles ===
Model	Image	Origin	Quantity	Details
CISR • Medium
Mohajer 6		Iran	n/a	Reported.
CISR • Light
ANSU-100		Venezuela	n/a	In test.
ISR • Light
Mohajer 2		Iran	n/a	
