= T94 =

T94 may refer to:

- AB Los Monjes (T-94), a landing craft of the Venezuelan Navy
- Cray T94, a supercomputer
- INS Tarasa (T94), a patrol vessel of the Indian Navy
