= Venezuelan patrol vessel Pagalo =

Patrol vessel

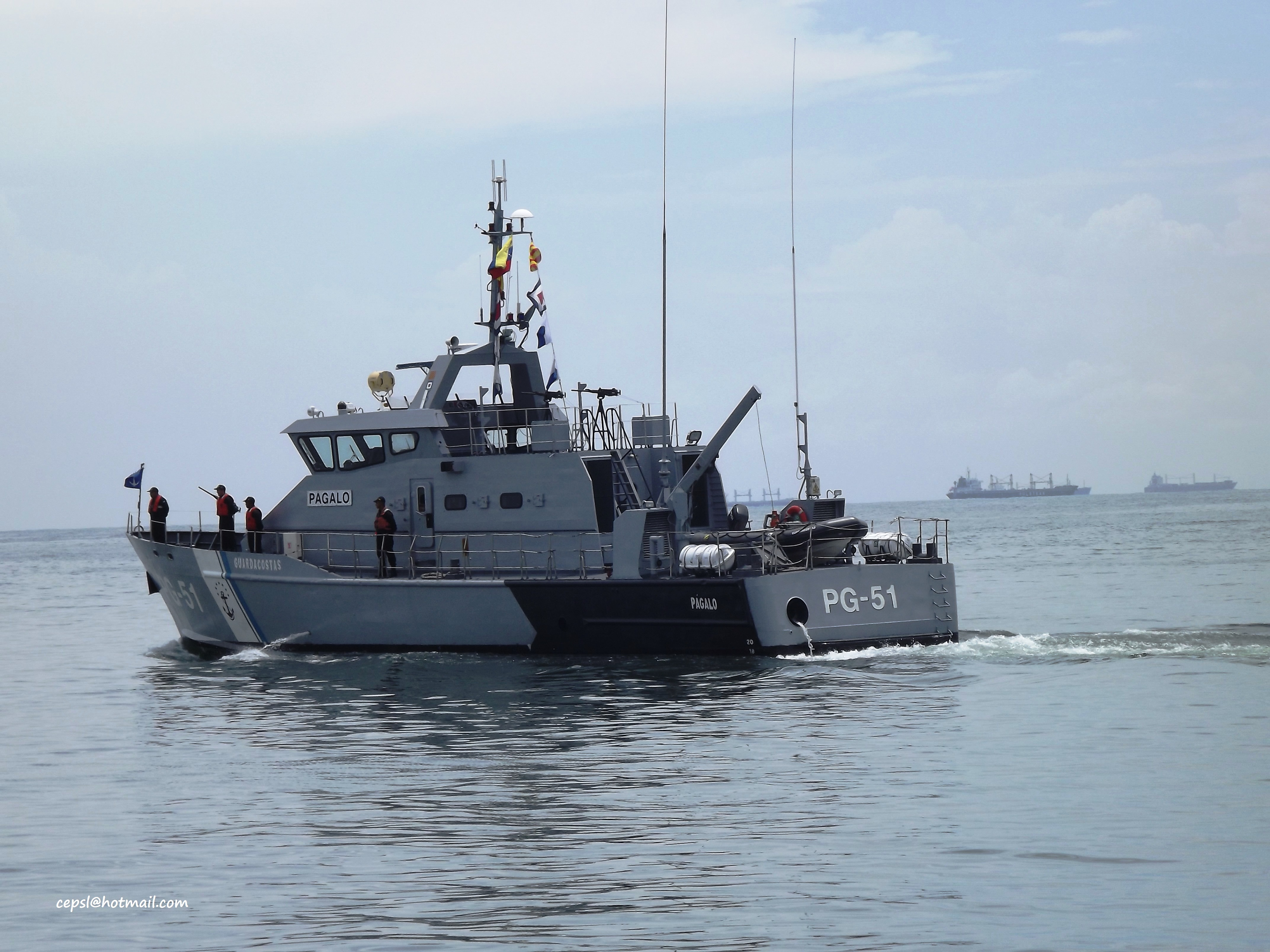
- Pagalo

History

Venezuela
- Name: Pagalo
- Builder: UCOCAR
- Cost: €4.5 million
- Identification: Pennant number: PG-51

General characteristics
- Type: Patrol vessel
- Displacement: 25 tons
- Length: 26.5 m (86 ft 11 in)
- Beam: 5.9 m (19 ft 4 in)
- Speed: 27 knots (50 km/h; 31 mph)
- Complement: 11
- Armament: 3 x 12.5 mm machine guns; 3 x 7.62 mm machine guns; 1 x 40 mm automatic grenade launcher

Pagalo (PG-51) is a patrol vessel operated by the Venezuelan Coast Guard. When she was commissioned in 2008 she was the first warship built in Venezuela. The vessel was built in the UCOCAR shipyards in Puerto Cabello to a variant of a design from the Damen Group. Other nations operate similar designs, including the Marine Protector class operated by the United States Coast Guard. According to the think tank Global Security Venezuela's 2606 patrol vessels are armed with six machine guns and a grenade launcher.

President Hugo Chavez officiated at the vessel's commissioning at La Guaira.

== Bibliography ==
- Scheina, Robert L. & Smigielski, Adam (1995). "Venezuela". In Chumbley, Stephen (ed.). Conway's All the World's Fighting Ships, 1947–1995 (revised ed.). Naval Institute Press. pp. 635–637. ISBN 1-55750-132-7.
