= Guaicamacuto-class patrol boat =

Class of offshore patrol vessels in the Venezuelan Navy

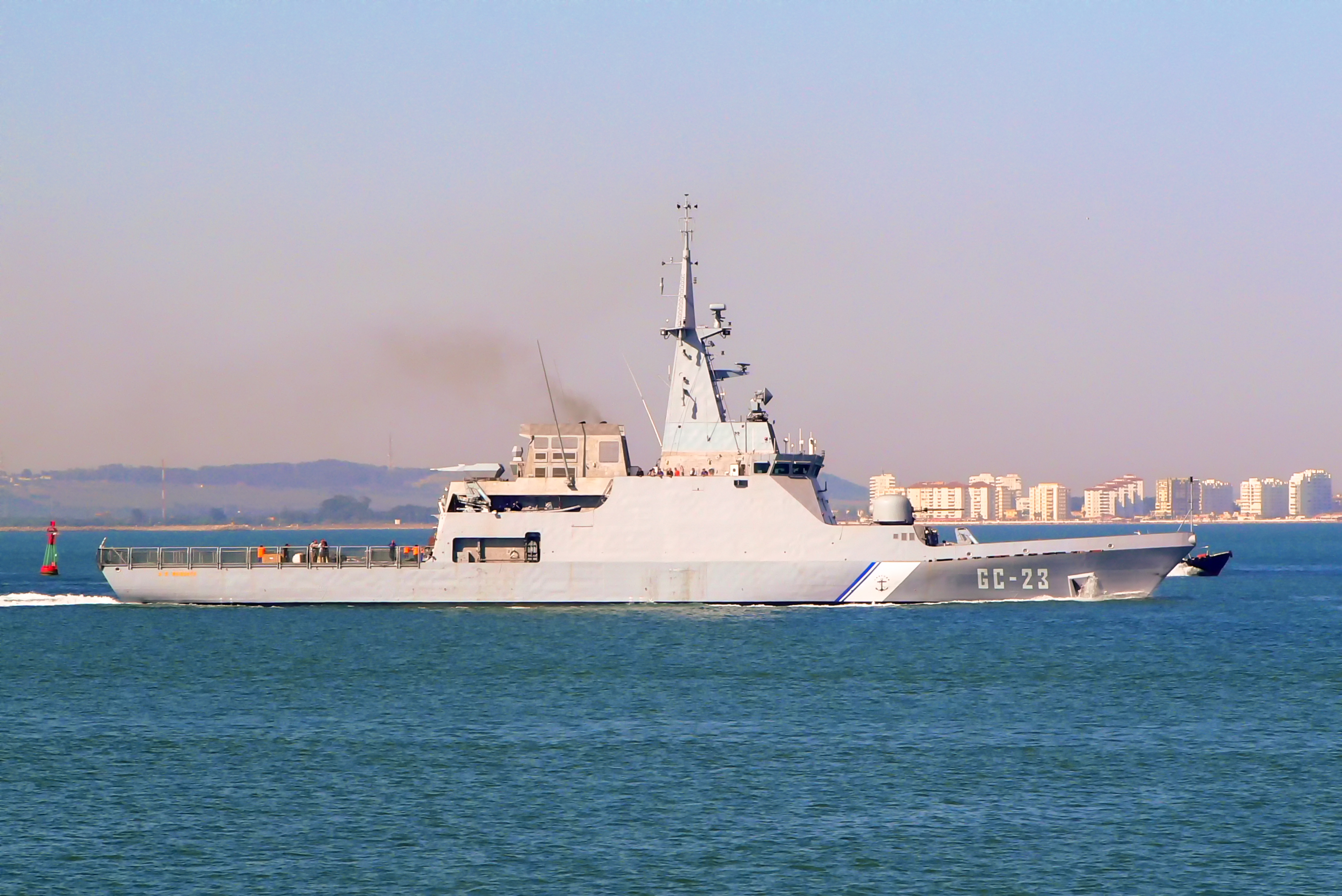
- Naiguatá during sea trials

Class overview
- Builders: Navantia, Cádiz, San Fernando Yard
- Operators: Bolivarian Navy of Venezuela
- Planned: 4
- Completed: 4
- Active: 3
- Lost: 1

General characteristics
- Type: Patrol vessel
- Displacement: 1,453 tons standard displacement, 1,720 tons full load
- Length: 79.9 m (262 ft 2 in)
- Beam: 11.8 m (38 ft 9 in) (max.)
- Draught: 7 m (23 ft 0 in)
- Propulsion: CODAD, 4 × MTU 12V-1163-TB93 rated at 4440 kW each; 2 × shaft with Wärtsilä 5C09 controllable pitch propeller
- Speed: 22 knots (41 km/h; 25 mph)
- Range: 4,000 nmi (7,400 km; 4,600 mi) at 16 knots (30 km/h; 18 mph)
- Complement: 34 + 30
- Sensors & processing systems: Surface Search radar: Thales VARIANT, I - G band; Fire Control radar: Thales STING EO, I - K band with TV/IR/Laser; Electro-Optics: Thales MIRADOR
- Armament: Guns: 1 × Oto Melara 76 mm (A position); 1 × 35 mm Oerlikon Millennium (Y position); 2 × 12.7 mm (B position)
- Aircraft carried: AB212, AB412 and AS565
- Aviation facilities: Landing pad

The Guaicamacuto-class patrol boats (Avante 1400) is a class of offshore patrol vessels or BVL (Spanish: Buque de Vigilancia de Litoral) in Venezuelan Navy service for patrol duty in the county's exclusive economic zone. A contract for four BVLs and four POVZEE was signed together on 25 November 2005. Since 2014 the Spanish Anticorruption Prosecutor's Office has been investigating the €42m "commission" paid to some of those involved.

The final vessel of the class was to have been named after Tamanaco, a 16th-century tribal leader, but in 2013 GC-24 was renamed Comandante eterno Hugo Chávez after the death of the then president. GC-24 was laid down in 2008 under the supervision of Navantia at the Venezuelan National Dams and Shipyards (DIANCA) in Puerto Cabello, was launched in 2014 and began sea trials in April 2018, but Navantia pulled out of Venezuela in January 2019 before trials were complete.

== Ships of class ==
Name	Pennant	Builder	Launched	Commissioned	Fate
Guaicamacuto	GC-21	Navantia, Spain	16 October 2008	2 March 2010	
Yaviré	GC-22	Navantia, Spain	11 March 2009	29 January 2011	
Naiguatá	GC-23	Navantia, Spain	24 June 2009	1 March 2011	Sunk after ramming an unarmed civilian vessel
Comandante eterno Hugo Chávez	GC-24	DIANCA, Puerto Cabello			

Naiguatá sunk after ramming the cruise ship RCGS Resolute on 30 March 2020 in an apparent attempt to seize it.

== See also ==
- Viana do Castelo-class patrol vessel
