= DIANCA =

DIANCA or National Docks and Shipyards C.A. (Spanish: Diques y Astilleros Nacionales Compañía Anónima) is the state-owned shipyard of the Bolivarian Republic of Venezuela. It was created in 1905 in the city of Puerto Cabello, Carabobo.

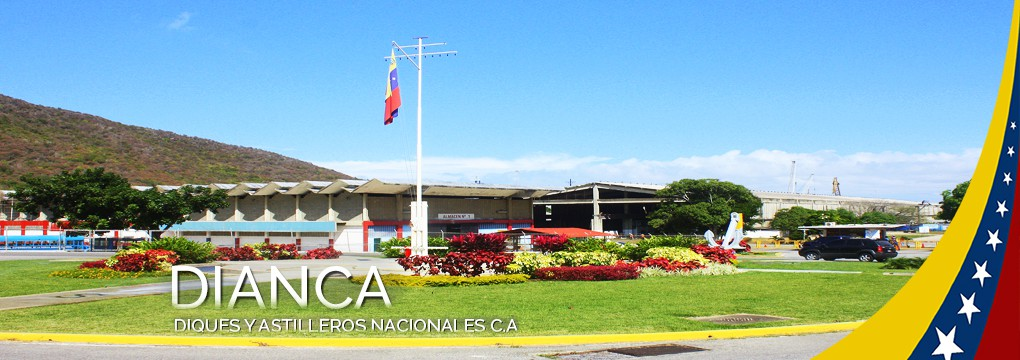
Outside of Dianca.

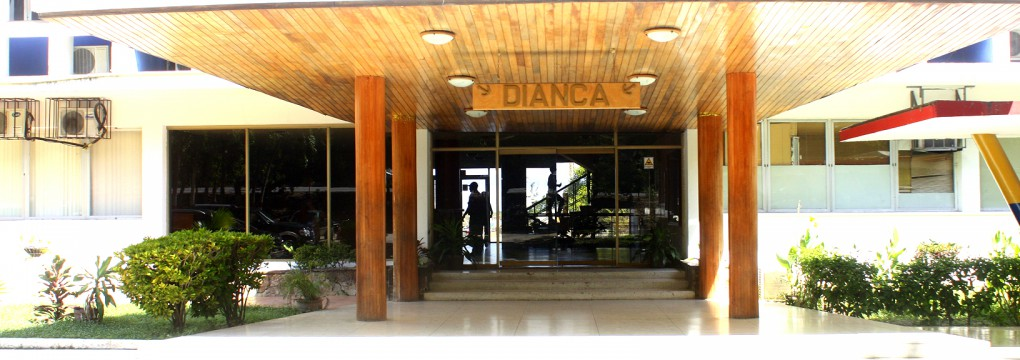
Entrance to the administrative building of DIQUES Y ASTILLEROS NACIONALES C.A.

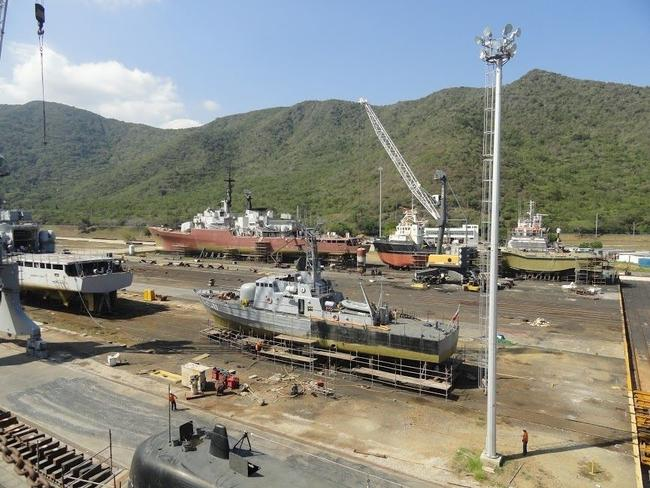
Syncrolift one of Dianca's facilities.

DIANCA was established by Presidential Decree as a subsidiary of the Venezuelan Ministry of Defense, then called the Ministry of War and Navy. It provides important maintenance to most of the Bolivarian Navy of Venezuela, but also to private companies and other state-owned companies such as Petroleum of Venezuela. Its current president is Rear Admiral Luis Enrique Castillo. It has also built boats mostly in kit form from the Damen Group shipyards and is currently working with Navantia to build some of the new 2000 tonne patrol boats. DIANCA is being a paradigm in the development of the Venezuelan shipbuilding industry. The establishment of an agreement with Argentina, Brazil and Spain, among other countries, resulted in the exchange of trained and specialized labor and the transfer of German technology, as in the case of Major Maintenance of the Sábalo-class submarines. Regarding Venezuela, the participants of the aforementioned exchange will be selected according to a matrix approved by the Board of Directors and for a few months Venezuelan personnel have been training in the repowering of submarines. DIANCA, in the agreements it carries out, requires that all those supplies (plates, pipes, cables, etc.) that are produced in Venezuela and be acquired in the country in order to strengthen the national industry. In addition to this, the possibility of carrying out projects for the construction of asphalt ships, coast guard patrol boats and expansion of the PDV fleet will promote the consolidation of others and therefore, will generate sources of work for the Venezuelan people. Although it is true that a year after its inauguration, National Docks and Shipyards caused a great impact in the Caribbean area, as time passed, this effect diminished until the beginning of the year 2000, which headed towards the third millennium and headed towards the century of its creation, a process of creating a holding company with other large shipyards to obtain a real transfer of technology, knowledge and external training and at an internal level to optimize the availability of machinery and equipment in order to maximize the company's production system. In the war memory y Marine Corresponding to the year 1913, the evaluation made by the government was expressed as follows: "...with all the personal and material elements to carry out works of the first magnitude, the ships of the Navy can be repaired quickly and with considerable economy in expenses, leaving beyond any doubt the advantages that the nation reports by having the means to repair its Navy always in its waters without the delays, excess expenses and other inconveniences that resulted when there was a need. "... to send their ships to foreign shipyards"... Today, when major maintenance is carried out in the country on two Mariscal Sucre-class missile frigates with the participation of national labor and strategic alliances with private companies, opening jobs for the community of Puerto Cabello, Borburata, San Esteban and other surrounding towns and the other projects already underway, agree or to the Bolivarian ideal of endogenous development, its maximum example being the Project for the Major Repowering of the Sábalo-class submarines, which, for the first time in Venezuela, is carrying out a technological transfer to higher levels of technology as developed as the German one that is being transferred to the workers and professionals of DIANCA, becoming the solid base for the consolidation of the Venezuelan naval industry together with indigenous initiatives such as the first time in Venezuela the wheels used in the Syncrolift (syncroelevator) were built, which is one of the stranding facilities owned by the shipyard for the repair, construction, reporting and maintenance processes of vessels of up to 5,000 tons. the wheels were built in the company FUNDICIÓN METALÚRGICA LEMOS, located in Barquisimeto, Lara State, under strict quality standards and the construction of 915 docking cars, 1080 connectors of different lengths and which were built in the company Fabricaciones Industriales, C.A. (FAINCA), located in Valencia, Carabobo state, the new Venezuela has charted its course towards the consolidation and international projection of its shipbuilding industry. In dianca they also offer other types of services such as the filling of Oxygen Pumps, Equipment and parts supply service.

== Diancalum ==
The aluminum division of dikes and shipyards C.A. DIANCA. Diancalum is a project within the framework of the National Waterway Plan of the Bolivarian Republic of Venezuela, which highlights the progress of the naval industry, and its growth by generating hundreds of decent jobs that allow the training of new generations of professionals in the naval area. They focus on their people and on the continuous improvement of teamwork as an essential ingredient to improve the quality of the work they perform at a professional level. This allows them to have the highest quality standard from the selection of the best raw materials, technological equipment and manufacturing processes that leads them to meet and exceed the expectations of their national and international clients.

== History ==
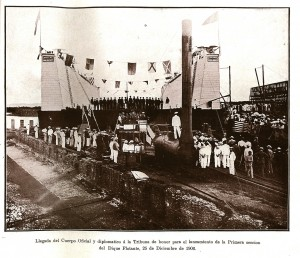
Arrival of the Official and Diplomatic Corps to the Tribune of Honor for the launching of the First Section of the Floating Dock, December 25, 1906.

The National Dock and Shipyard of Puerto Cabello was created in 1905, by decree of the Presidency of the Republic, and attached to the former Ministry of War and Navy. Of his achievements, the Coast Guard "29 de Enero" and the merchant ship "Nuevo Mara" are still remembered, vessels that for many years provided efficient services. A Wooden Floating Dock at that time allowed ships of up to 1,200 tons to be repaired, and later, in 1910, a floating dock with a displacement of 5,000 tons was installed, both installations lasted until 1938.

In 1942, two inclined-plane slipways were installed, with a capacity of 1,500 and 500 tons, respectively, in which the maintenance service is carried out for the smaller ships of the Navy Squad, the Merchant Navy and Fiscal Boats. of the National Guard.

In 1947, the National Constituent Assembly of the United States of Venezuela decreed the Law of National Docks and Shipyards, through which the current Autonomous Institute of National Docks and Shipyards was created, attached to the Ministry of Defense, with autonomous legal personality and with own and independent assets of the National Treasury.

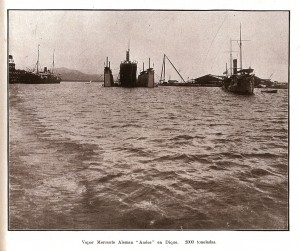
German Merchant Steamer at "Dock". 2000 Tons.

In September 1968, the National Congress of the Republic approved the Public Credit Law through which the Autonomous Institute "Diques y Astilleros Nacionales" was authorized to make use of public credit, up to the amount of one hundred million bolívares (Bs. 100,000,000.00), for the completion of the system of installations and equipment corresponding to the Puerto Cabello Dry Dock. Having carried out the necessary studies, projects and bidding, the completion works began, in its first part, during the month of July of the same year.

On October 16, 1975, it became a Limited Company, its main shareholder being the Investment Fund of Venezuela. It has been a fundamental pillar of the development of the Naval Industry and the Buenos Aires area.

=== Presidents ===
Román Delgado Chalbaud (1906-1908)

Luis Muñoz Tébar (1909-1910)

Dr Pedro José Rojas (1910-1913)

R. Gil Garmendia (1913)

Jorge Peoli Sucre (1914)

Luis E. Lebrún (1914-1915)

Luis E. Gámez (1923-1924)

E. Ocanto (1924-1926)

Enrique Lebrún (1926-1927)

R. Bustamante Berti (1928-1929)

Ing Tomás Pacanins (1930-1935)

Dr Mariano Contreras (1936)

ing Manuel Silveira (1937-1940)

Carlos Luis Ferrero (1941-1943)

CC. César E. Castillo (1945)

CF. Remigio Elías Perez (April–May 1950)

CF. Pedro Rafael Figallo Bello (1950-1953)

CF. Alonso Ramón Viloria Dávila (1953-1956)

CN. Ramón Rivero Núñez (1956-1961)

CN. Rafael Álvarez Álvarez (1961-1966)

CN. José V. Azopardo Mirabal (1966-1970)

VA. Armando Pérez Leefmans (1970-1973)

CA. Miguel Benatuil Guastini (1973-1977)

VA. Edgar Senior Díaz (1977-1980)

CA. Carlos Páez Celis (1980-1987)

CA. Augusto Brito Ascanio (1987-1991)

CA. Félix García Zambrano (1991-1997)

CN. Carlos Andrés Moreno Bonilla (1997-2001)

CA. Willys Izaguirre D´Imperio (2001-2004)

CA. Ewald Quintana Fondis (2004)

Rear Admiral Luis Enrique Castillo (2019–Present).
