= Lawrence Whitfield Major =

Lawrence Whitfield Major MBE QPM CPM
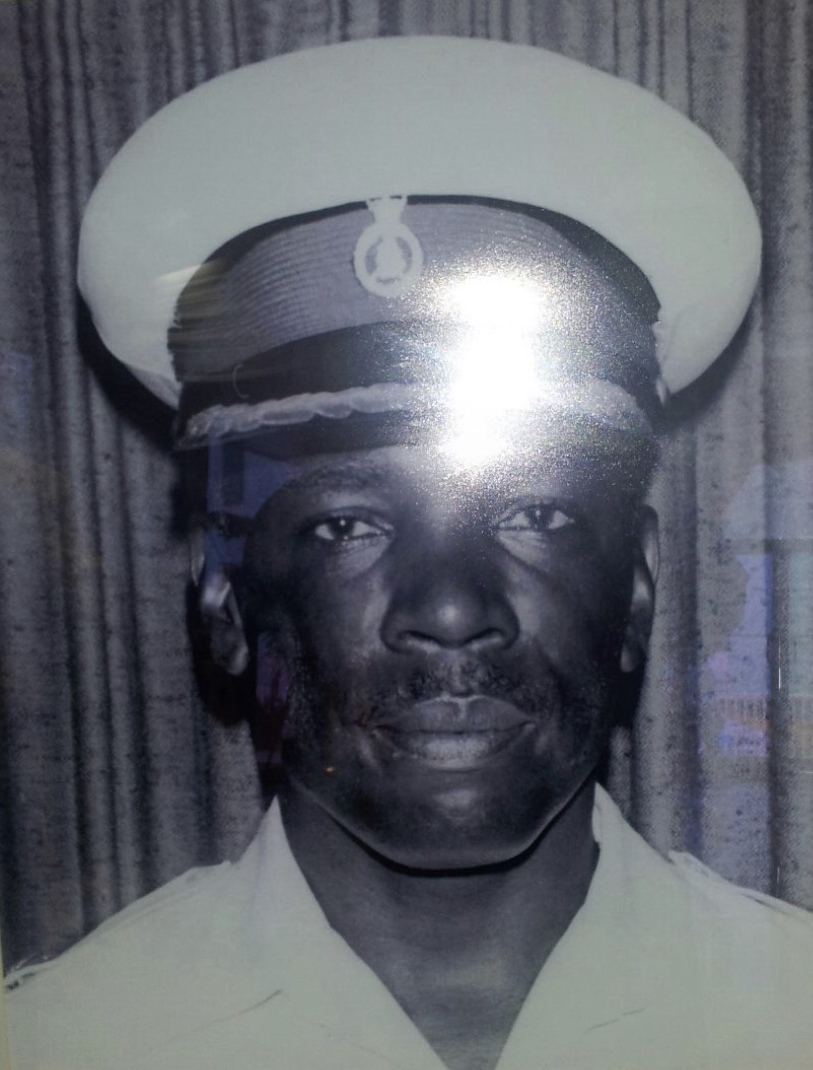

Lawrence Whitfield Major (died 2008) was a senior police officer in the Bahamas. He joined the police in 1950 and helped to disperse a crowd gathered to support Lynden Pindling's protest at the House of Assembly in 1965. Major was appointed to lead the police's Marine Division in 1971 and helped to raid drug smugglers operating from the islands. He retired as assistant commissioner in 1980 and later served as superintendent of the national prison department.

== Police career ==
Whitfield joined the Bahamas' police force in 1950 and in 1962 he was awarded the Queen's Commendation for Brave Conduct. The commendation was awarded for actions, as a sergeant, during "the arrest of an armed and dangerous criminal". On 26 April 1964, a day known in the Bahamas as Black Tuesday, Inspector Major led the enforcement of the Riot Act by dispersing a crowd that had gathered at the House of Assembly. The crowd had assembled in support of the Progressive Liberal Party whose leader, Lynden Pindling, had thrown the speaker's mace out of the house. Pindling was protesting the drawing up of constituency boundaries that had, in the 1962 Bahamian general election (the first in the territory under universal suffrage), given his part a minority of seats despite winning a majority of the vote. Major, vastly outnumbered and armed only with a truncheon and wicker shield, was assisted by Pindling, who enjoined his followers to follow non-violent means, in dispersing the crowd.

In 1971, when the Police force created a Police Marine Division, Major was put in charge. The Marine Division later became part of the Royal Bahamas Defence Force, founded in 1980. In the 1972 New Year Honours Superintendent Major was awarded the Colonial Police Medal for Meritorious Service. From 1974, as assistant commissioner, he led patrols of the Marine Division against drug smugglers. In 1977 Major was awarded the Queen's Police Medal for distinguished service and on 30 December 1978 was appointed a Member of the Order of the British Empire. In early 1979 he made the largest single seizure of cocaine at the time, taking 274 pounds (124 kg) from a light aircraft in George Town, Exuma.

In March 1979 Major, then an assistant commissioner, and two colleagues identified a network of drug smugglers operating across the Bahamas. Their report was kept secret until 1984 by which time the police had seized hundreds of tons of cannabis and cocaine in raids.

== Retirement and legacy ==
Major retired from the police as an assistant commissioner in August 1980. By 1992 he was superintendent of the Bahamas Prisons Department, remaining in post until at least 1994. Major died in 2008.

In 2016 the Royal Bahamas Defence Force commissioned the HMBS Lawrence Major.
