= Damen Stan Patrol 2606 =

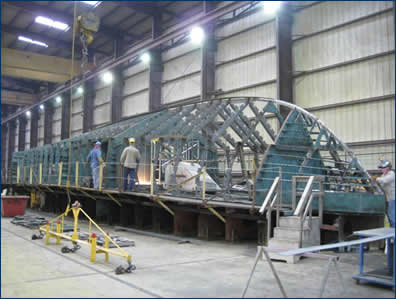
Constructing the hull of a Damen Stan 2600.

The Damen Stan 2600 is a line of patrol vessels built or designed by Netherlands shipbuilding firm the Damen Group.

== Operators ==
The first vessels of this design were delivered to the Hong Kong Police in 2007.

Vietnam Maritime search and Rescue Coordination Center operates 3 x 28.9 m variant of the Stan Patrol 2606 vessels delivered in 2004:

- SAR-273
- SAR-274
- SAR-272

The United States Coast Guard Marine Protector class of cutters are based on the Damen Stan 2600 design. A total of 78 Marine Protector class vessels were built by Bollinger Shipyards—74 for the United States Coast Guard (USCG), two for the United States Navy (USN), two for Malta and two for Yemen. Four of the last vessels in the USCG possession are owned by the USN, but are crewed and managed by the USCG and bear USCG pennant numbers.

The USN relies on these vessels to escort its nuclear submarines as they enter and exit from their ports, where submarines may be vulnerable to bombers until they can get to water deep enough to dive. Distinguishing them from the remainder of the vessels in the USCG fleet, the USN's four vessels are equipped with a gyro-stabilized machine gun, remotely controlled from the bridge.

The Venezuelan Navy operates vessels built to the Damen Stan design. The vessels were built in Venezuela. In March 2008 a newly constructed vessel was sent to Nicaragua to try to solicit orders from the Government of Nicaragua.

In November 2011 Ecuador signed a contract to build vessels of the related 2606 design for the Ecuadorian Coast Guard.

In January 2012 Cuba and Venezuela entered into an agreement to cooperate in the construction of vessels built to the Damen Stan 2606 design. The vessels will be built in the UCOCAR in Puerto Cabello, Venezuela.

In May 2014 the Bahamas also ordered four patrol vessels based on Damen's 26 metre design.

specifications
length	26.5 metres (87 ft)
speed	25-35 knots
complement	8

== See also ==
- Damen Stan patrol vessel 4207
- Damen Stan patrol vessel 4708
- Sea Devil
- Sea Fox
