= Azio-class minelayer =

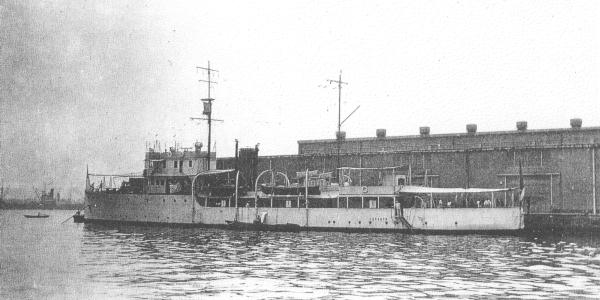
- Minelayer Lepanto at Yokohama on 18 April 1938

Class overview
- Name: Azio-class minelayer
- Builders: Cantiere Navale Triestino, Monfalcone; Cantieri Navali Riuniti, Ancona
- Operators: Regia Marina; Italian Navy; Bolivarian Navy of Venezuela; Imperial Japanese Navy; (Taiwan) Republic of China Navy
- In service: 1926-1957
- Planned: 6
- Completed: 6
- Lost: 1
- Retired: 5

General characteristics
- Type: Minelayer
- Displacement: 708 - 718 tons (normal); 954 tons (full load)
- Length: 62.5 m (205 ft)
- Beam: 8.7 m (29 ft)
- Height: 4.8 m (16 ft)
- Draft: 2.6 m (8.5 ft) - 2.9 m (9.5 ft)
- Installed power: 1,500 shp (1,100 kW)
- Propulsion: 2 × Thornycroft tube boilers; 2 × vertical triple-expansion reciprocating steam engines; 2 × shafts
- Speed: 15 knots (28 km/h)
- Range: 4,000 nautical miles (7,400 km) at 10 kn (19 km/h)
- Crew: 5 officers and 66 ratings
- Armament: 2 × 102/35mm (or 102/45mm) Terni (or Ansaldo Schneider) mod. 1914; 1 × 76/40 mm Ansaldo mod. 1917; 40 mines

The Azio-class minelayer was a class of six minelayers conceived in 1920 and built between 1924 and 1927 in Italy for the Regia Marina. The ships were conceived for colonial purposes and in this role they spent almost the whole Italian career. Some units were sold to the Bolivarian Navy of Venezuela where they served until their decommissioning and scrapping in the early 1950s.

== Project ==
These units had a standard displacement of 615 t, between 708 and 718t in normal load, and 954 t full load (850 t according to other sources). Their waterline length was 58.79 metres (192.9 ft), with a length overall of about 62.5 metres (205 ft), a beam of 8.7 metres (29 ft), a draught of between 2.6 metres (8.5 ft) and 2.9 metres (9.5 ft). Steam was provided by 2 Thornycroft tube boilers and they were propelled by 2 vertical triple-expansion reciprocating steam engines with a power of 1,500 shaft horsepower (1,100 kW); they had 2 screws and a maximum speed of 15 knots (28 km/h; 17 mph), giving a range of 4,000 nautical miles (7,400 km) at 10 knots. They were manned by 5 officers and 66 ratings.

Ships were built at Monfalcone, near Trieste, in the Cantiere Navale Triestino (CNT Shipyard) and at Ancona, on the central Italian coast, in the Cantiere Navale Riuniti (CNR, Ancona). The CNT ships (Dardanelli, Millazo and Ostia) were oil-fired, while the CNR ships (Azio, Legnano and Ostia) were coal-fired.

== Units ==
- Azio
- Lepanto
- Legnano
- Ostia
- Dardanelli
- Milazzo

== History ==
Most ships of the class spent their Italian career on colonial duty, with Lepanto deployed to China. In 1937 Milazzo and Dardanelli were converted to oil-firing and sold to the Venezuelan Navy in exchange for a great amount of naphtha for boilers.

Azio was initially assigned to Libya and later to the Red Sea Flotilla based at the port of Massawa, Eritrea, where it performed a hydrographic survey from 1930 to 1933. In 1939, Azio was part of the naval force supporting the Italian invasion of Albania. After the entry of Italy in World War II in 1940, the unit, operating from Pola, laid down 21 minefields intended to deter enemy submarines in the Adriatic. Azio carried out minesweeping missions, escort duties and naval patrols. Azio's wireless resources allowed it to be converted, if needed, into a command and control auxiliary ship. On 31 July 1941, while patrolling the Aegean Sea, Azio seized a British sailing ship involved in underground operations in support of Greek partisans in the Peloponnese. At the time of the Cassabile armistice on 8 September 1943, Azio was part of the Dodecanese naval forces, and became the target of several Luftwaffe air strikes which forced it to seek shelter in Turkish waters. The Italian minelayer spent the rest of the war interned in Turkey. After its return to Italy, Azio was assigned once again to hydrographic duties until being decommissioning in 1957.

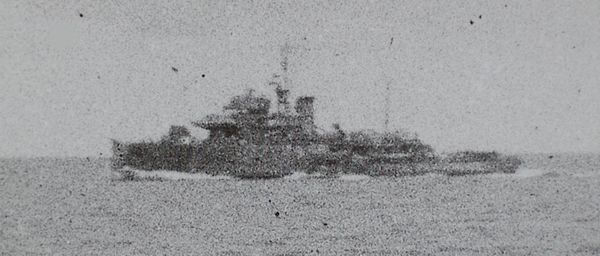
Okitsu escorting convoy «ShiSe 603», in Eastern Chinese Sea, 18 June 1945

Lepanto was extensively used in China, and when the Second World War broke out, was still there unscathed, Italy being allied with Japan. After the surrender of Italy to the Allies on 8 September 1943, Lepanto was scuttled by her crew, but was raised by the Japanese. She was renamed Okitsu (Japanese: 興津) and used for escort duties for the rest of conflict. She was then seized by the Republic of China Navy and renamed Hsien Ning (咸寧). In July 1950 Hsien Ning seized a British merchantman. Struck in 1956, the ship was scrapped in the same year.

Ostia was assigned to support the Italian Red Sea Flotilla based at the port of Massawa, Eritrea. After the Italian declaration of war on 10 June 1940, the flotilla was isolated from the Italian homeland and continued supply and reinforcement became very difficult. Ostia was eventually sunk in Massawa harbor by British air attacks before the surrender of the port in April 1941, still carrying a full cargo of mines.

Dardanelli was rechristened General Soublette, while Milazzo become General Urdaneta. Both were reclassified gunboats. These units were the only relatively new vessels of the Venezuelan Navy, and spent their Venezuelan career patrolling territorial waters until their decommissioned in the late 1940s or early 1950s and scrapping.
