= Venezuelan patrol boat Naiguatá =

Venezuelan coast guard boat

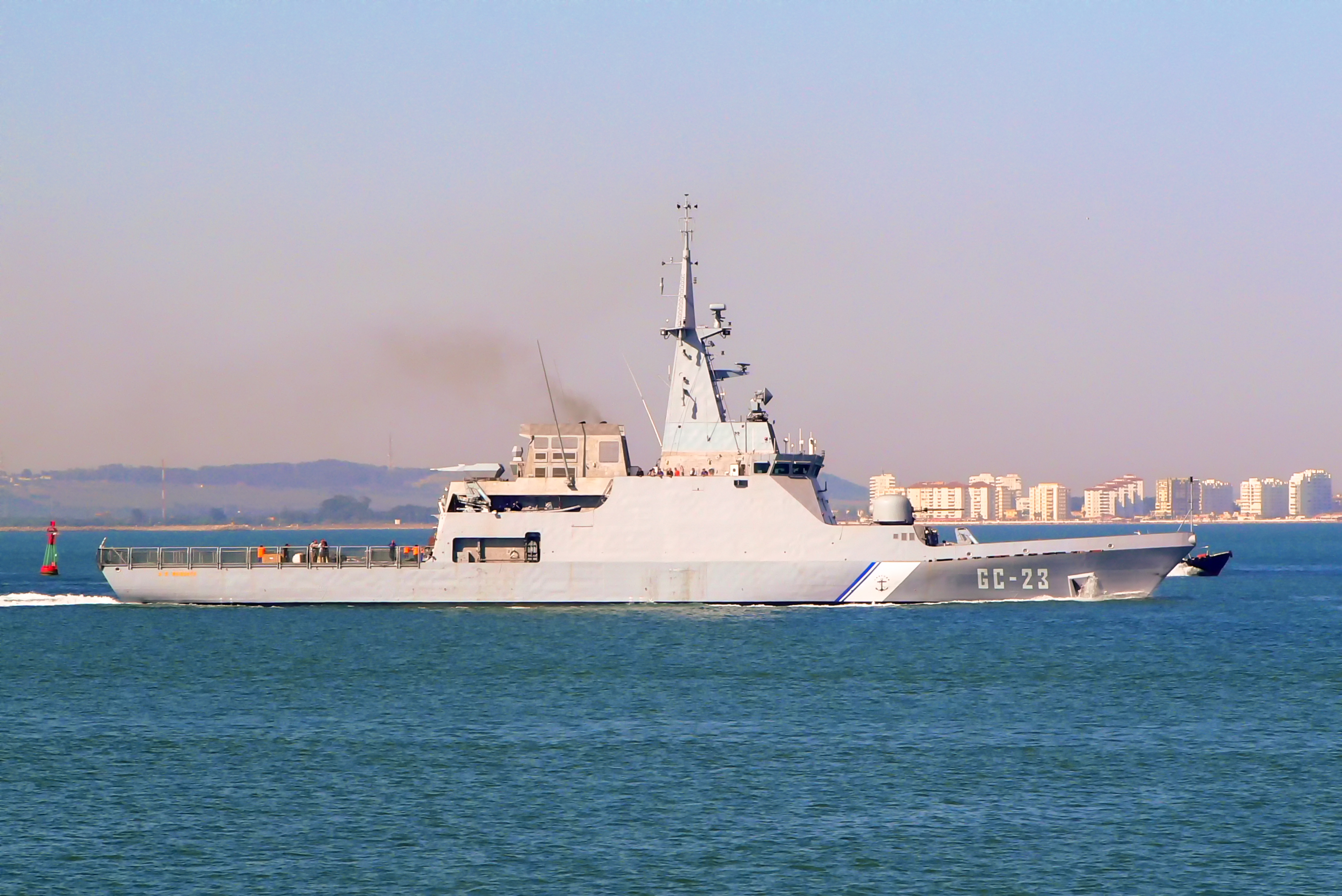
- Naiguatá during sea trials

History

Venezuela
- Name: Naiguatá
- Namesake: City of Naiguatá
- Builder: Navantia, Cádiz, Spain
- Laid down: October 2008
- Launched: 24 June 2009
- Sponsored by: Alma Pura de Padrón
- Identification: GC-23
- Fate: Sunk, 30 March 2020

General characteristics
- Class & type: Guaicamacuto-class patrol boat
- Displacement: 1,453 long tons (1,476 t) (standard); 1,720 long tons (1,750 t) (full load)
- Length: 79.9 m (262 ft 2 in)
- Beam: 11.8 m (38 ft 9 in) (max.)
- Draught: 7 m (23 ft 0 in)
- Installed power: 4 × MTU 12V-1163-TB93; 4,440 kW (5,950 shp)
- Propulsion: CODAD; 2 × shaft with Wärtsilä 5C09 controllable pitch propeller
- Speed: 22 knots (41 km/h; 25 mph)
- Range: 4,000 nmi (7,400 km; 4,600 mi) at 16 knots (30 km/h; 18 mph)
- Complement: 34 + 30
- Sensors & processing systems: Surface search radar: Thales VARIANT, I - G band; Fire control radar: Thales STING EO, I - K band with TV/IR/Laser; Electro-optics: Thales MIRADOR
- Armament: 1 × 76 mm (3.0 in)/62 caliber Oto Melara gun (A position); 1 × 35 mm (1.4 in) Oerlikon Millennium gun (Y position); 2 × 12.7 mm (0.50 in) guns (B position)
- Aircraft carried: 1 × AB212, AB412, or AS565 helicopters
- Aviation facilities: Landing pad

Naiguatá (GC-23) was a 79.9-metre (262 ft) Guaicamacuto-class patrol boat of the Venezuelan Coast Guard. The vessel was constructed by Navantia in Cádiz, Spain beginning in 2008. On 30 March 2020, the vessel collided with the cruise ship RCGS Resolute in international waters and sank.

== Construction and career ==
Naiguatá was the 3rd ship of the Guaicamacuto-class BVLs. BVL stands for "Buque de Vigilancia de Litoral", which is Spanish for littoral surveillance ship. It had a displacement of 1,720 tons. It was built by Navantia in Spain at the San Fernando shipyards in Cádiz, based on a standard Navantia Avante 1400 design. The keel was laid in October 2008. The ship was launched on 24 June 2009, christened by Alma Pura de Padrón and named after the city of Naiguatá. The Venezuelan Navy took delivery of Naiguatá from the builder and subsequently transferred it to the Venezuelan Coast Guard. Its weapons systems consisted of one Leonardo OTO Melara 76 mm gun, one CIWS anti-aircraft/anti-missile Rheinmetall Oerlikon Millennium Gun, and two 12.7 mm machine guns.

=== Sinking ===
Naiguatá sank following a collision with the ice class cruise ship RCGS Resolute while in international waters on 30 March 2020. According to RCGS Resolute's owner, the Coast Guard ship had fired shots and ordered the cruise ship to follow it to Margarita Island, a Venezuelan harbour. Naiguatá sank following the collision, with RCGS Resolute informing the international Maritime Rescue Coordination Centre (MRCC) of the incident and offering assistance. After staying in the area for an hour, RCGS Resolute was informed through MRCC that assistance was not required as Naiguatá's crew had been rescued by the Venezuelan Navy.

Venezuelan president Nicolás Maduro accused the captain of the cruise ship of "piracy" and "terrorism", adding later that he did not rule out that RCGS Resolute was "carrying mercenaries to attack onshore military bases". The Venezuelan minister of defence said RCGS Resolute's action was an act of "imperial aggression".

==== Portuguese investigation details ====
On 6 April, the Office for the Investigation of Maritime Accidents and the Aeronautical Meteorology Authority (Gabinete de Investigação de Acidentes Marítimos e da Autoridade para a Meteorologia Aeronáutica or GAMA) of Portugal released a technical investigation report on the incident involving the Portuguese-flagged cruise ship.

According to the report, RCGS Resolute had departed Buenos Aires on 5 March and sailed to the Caribbean Sea along the South American coastline. On 28 March, the vessel had stopped in the open sea to allow the crew to carry out maintenance work in the engine room. After drifting closer to the Venezuelan coast on the following day, RCGS Resolute had resumed sailing west for about 90 minutes until the ship had passed La Tortuga Island and then continued adrift to a westerly direction while the starboard main engine turbocharger was being serviced.

On the night of 30 March, RCGS Resolute was contacted by the Venezuelan Coast Guard patrol boat Naiguatá at around quarter past midnight. After a brief questioning over VHF Marine band radio, the cruise ship was ordered to follow the Venezuelan vessel to Puerto Moreno on the basis that the Portuguese-flagged vessel was violating Venezuelan territorial waters. After consulting with the company designated person ashore (DPA), RCGS Resolute announced that the vessel would start engines and resume voyage to Curaçao.

At around 01:05 local time, Naiguatá approached RCGS Resolute from the starboard quarter and, after suddenly changing course to port, collided with the bow of the cruise ship. A few minutes later, RCGS Resolute's master ordered the port side controllable pitch propeller first to zero pitch and then to astern thrust in order to separate the vessels. The company DPA instructed the cruise ship to remain on site and contact the local Maritime Rescue Coordination Centre (MRCC). At 01:38, about half an hour after the collision, Naiguatá's Automatic Identification System-Search and Rescue Transmitter (AIS-SART) was activated but RCGS Resolute was unable to establish contact with the sinking Venezuelan vessel over the radio and instead contacted JRCC Curaçao. About one hour later, the Venezuelan crew was seen preparing liferafts for launching. At 02:43, JRCC Curaçao relayed a statement from the Venezuelan authority responsible for the region, MRCC La Guaira, that RCGS Resolute's assistance was no longer needed on site and instructed the cruise ship to proceed to Willemstad in order to avoid problems with the Venezuelan Navy.

Although the Portuguese authorities had not obtained statements from Venezuela, the report discussed the possibility that the unexpected change in Naiguatá's heading just before the collision, as reported by RCGS Resolute, may have been caused by a suction effect between the vessels as the faster patrol boat passed the bow of the cruise ship. Although the collision may have not been intentional ramming, the conclusion was nonetheless that the incident that led to the sinking of Naiguatá was a deliberate act initiated by the Venezuelan Navy rather than an accidental occurrence.
