= Italian minelayer Lepanto =

1927 Azio-class minelayer

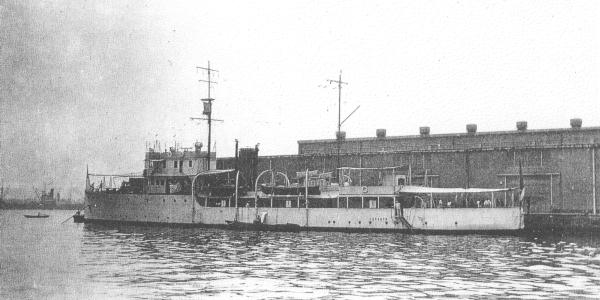
- Lepanto at Yokohama in 1938

History

Italy
- Name: Lepanto
- Namesake: Battle of Lepanto
- Builder: Cantieri Navali Riuniti (CNR), Ancona
- Laid down: 1925
- Launched: 22 May 1927
- Commissioned: 1927
- Fate: Scuttled 9 September 1943 at Shanghai

Japan
- Name: Okitsu (興津)
- Namesake: Okitsu-juku
- Builder: Navy 1st Construction Department at Shanghai
- Acquired: 8 November 1943
- Commissioned: 1 March 1944
- Decommissioned: 30 September 1945
- Fate: Surrendered to Republic of China on 15 September 1945

Republic of China
- Name: Hsien Ning (咸寧)
- Namesake: Xianning
- Acquired: 15 September 1945
- Commissioned: 1946
- Decommissioned: 1956
- Identification: Pennant number: 79
- Fate: Scrapped in 1956

General characteristics as Lepanto
- Class & type: Azio-class minelayer
- Displacement: 615 long tons (625 t)
- Length: 66.0 m (216 ft 6 in) (overall)
- Beam: 8.7 m (28 ft 7 in)
- Draft: 2.4 m (7 ft 10 in)
- Propulsion: 2 × Yarrow three expansion stages reciprocating engines; 2 × water tube boilers; 2 shafts, 1,500 shp
- Speed: 15.0 knots (27.8 km/h; 17.3 mph)
- Complement: 66
- Armament: 2 × 102 mm (4.0 in) naval guns; 1 × 76 mm (3.0 in) 76/40 Ansaldo Mod. 1917 AA gun; 2 × machine guns; 80 × naval mines

General characteristics as Okitsu
- Class & type: Gunboat
- Displacement: 700 long tons (711 t) standing
- Length: 62.18 m (204 ft 0 in) Lpp
- Beam: 8.69 m (28 ft 6 in)
- Draft: 2.60 m (8 ft 6 in)
- Speed: 13.7 knots (25.4 km/h; 15.8 mph)
- Complement: approx. 80
- Armament: 2 × 76.2 mm (3.00 in) L/40 AA guns; 10 × Type 96 25 mm AA guns; 36 × depth charges; 2 × Type 94 depth charge projectors; 2 × depth charge throwers; 1 × Type 93 active sonar; 1 × Type 93 hydrophone

General characteristics as Hsien Ning
- Type: Frigate
- Armament: in 1950; 2 × 3-inch/50-caliber guns; 2 × 1.1-inch/75-caliber guns; 4 × 20 mm AA guns

Lepanto was an Azio-class minelayer of the Royal Italian Navy. She was reclassified as gunboat in 1934 and remained in Italian service in the Far East from 1933 to 1943, when she was scuttled in China, during World War II. She was then recovered by the Imperial Japanese Navy and taken into service as Okitsu, spending the remainder of the war escorting convoys. She was surrendered to the Republic of China after the end of the war and served for a further ten years with the Republic of China Navy as the Hsien Ning; and then, according to some sources, with the People's Liberation Army Navy.

== Construction and characteristics ==
Built between 1925 and 1927 at the Cantieri Navali Riuniti shipyards in Ancona, the Lepanto belonged to the Azio class, designed in the early 1920s (the ships of the class were ordered in 1924 for service in the colonies). The project was developed by the naval engineer Colonel Francesco Rotundi. The ships of this class were intended to serve both as minelayers and as colonial vessels: their principal task was to lay defensive minefields in the waters of Italian colonies and possessions in the Mediterranean Sea and Red Sea, protecting their coastlines. In addition to laying defensive barriers along the sea lanes leading to Italian ports, these vessels could also deploy offensive minefields on routes used by enemy shipping, and they were also capable of operating as minesweepers. Thanks to their excellent seakeeping qualities, the ships of the Azio class proved suitable during the 1920s and 1930s for a wide variety of roles, including gunboats, training ships, colonial vessels, hydrographic ships or station ships in foreign waters (all tasks for which Lepanto was indeed employed), usable both in Italy and in colonial or even more distant waters.

During construction the ships of the class were modified with the addition of extra weight, which reduced the speed by one knot (from 16 to 15) compared with the design specification, but still allowed them to be used as escort ships. Since they had also been conceived for representation abroad and long stays in warm climates, the ships of the class had particularly comfortable and carefully arranged fittings, even luxurious. They were equipped with thermal insulation (allowing long deployments in tropical climates without excessive temperatures in interior spaces) and powerful radio stations. There were also extra accommodations in order to host additional personnel. Thanks to their shallow draft and versatility, the ships could also be used, when necessary, in river navigation.

The Azio-class minelayers had a straight stem, a high freeboard and more than one third of the hull occupied by the forecastle. Behind it was a large deckhouse extending to the stern. At the forward end of the forecastle deck were the bridge and wheelhouse (forming a single block) and an open upper bridge on two decks; behind them was the funnel, slightly inclined toward the stern, followed by the hatches of the engine room and the secondary steering position. There were two vertical pole masts without shrouds. Under the forecastle and in the forward part of the lower deck were the crew quarters, while aft of the engine room on the lower deck were the cabins of the officers and senior non-commissioned officers. Amidships, on the sides of the main deck, were the cranes used to handle various motor launches and boats used for service tasks. The hull was built of mild steel produced using the Siemens–Martin process.

The engine system consisted of two vertical triple-expansion steam engines powered by two water-tube boilers, developing a total output of 1,500 hp. This allowed a speed of 15 knots, with a range of 1,500 nautical miles at that speed. The arrangement of the machinery on two shafts, together with the hull design, gave the Azio-class vessels excellent seakeeping and maneuverability. While Lepanto, Azio and Legnano had oil-fired boilers (75 tonnes), Dardanelli, Ostia and Milazzo had coal-fired boilers (85 tonnes). According to some sources the ships were originally also equipped with auxiliary sails: a jib of 26 m², a staysail of 93 m², a mainsail of 98 m² and a topsail of 98 m². The rudder was not balanced.

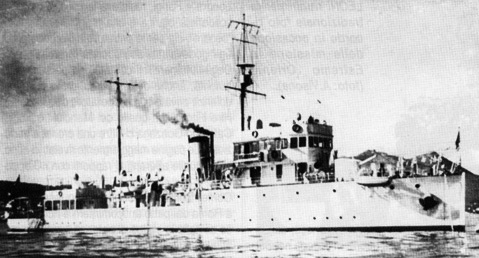
Photograph of Lepanto.

The main armament consisted of two cannons Terni (or Ansaldo Schneider) 102/35 Mod. 1914, one mounted on the forecastle deck forward of the bridge and the other on the roof of the aft end of the deckhouse. As secondary armament, Lepanto carried one 40/39 mm autocannon (other sources state two), while the other ships of the class carried a 76/40 Ansaldo Mod. 1917 anti-aircraft gun. The ships were equipped to carry and lay 80 naval mines with a total weight of 86 tonnes.

The success of the Azio class was such that plans were made to reproduce the design in a larger number of improved vessels, but this proved impossible because of a lack of funds. Two improved Azio-type ships, the Babr class, were later built for the Imperial Iranian Navy. The lines of the Azio class were revisited in 1941 when the Gabbiano-class corvettes were designed.

== History ==
=== Royal Italian Navy service (1927–1943) ===
In the period immediately following her entry into service, Lepanto took part in training cruises.

In October 1928 the minelayer was stationed at Thessaloniki as a station ship. In 1931 the unit was employed as a hydrographic ship to complete systematic surveys in Libyan waters.

In the early 1930s it was decided, because of age, to replace Sebastiano Caboto, one of the two gunboats deployed on the rivers of China to protect Italian interests (the other was Carlotto). To replace Caboto, Lepanto was selected (according to another source, her dispatch to the Far East and the Indian Ocean had been decided since her entry into service): on 11 November 1932, under the command of frigate captain Priamo Leonardi, the minelayer sailed from Italy for the Far East. After various stops at Port Said, Aden, Bombay and Singapore, the ship—following the route usually taken by small vessels not suited to face the force of the monsoons on the northern routes—coasted the Philippines and called at Manila, where she was welcomed triumphantly by the local Italian community; then, heading for China, she encountered heavy weather, being forced to heave-to and stop at San Fernando (Luzon) and then to lie-to for two days off Amoy. Lepanto then encountered a typhoon, which she overcame thanks to her good seakeeping qualities and the skill of her crew. The ship finally arrived at Shanghai on 10 March 1933 (other sources give 1934 or 1935), operating in China—especially on the Yangtze—for the next seven years, being used mainly as a gunboat. In December 1933 the ship was present during Guglielmo Marconi's visit to the local Italian community.

On the night of 9–10 October 1934 the unit, anchored at Kichow, was rammed by the British steamship Hopecrag due to an incorrect manoeuvre carried out by that ship while descending the river. Lepanto suffered minor damage to her bow.

Late in 1934 Lepanto carried out short coastal and river cruises, for which she was particularly well suited, thus protecting, by her presence, Italian citizens and Catholic missions (China was shaken by continuous internal conflicts and security was very poor), especially where larger ships could not reach. Returning to Shanghai on 26 November 1934, the gunboat remained there until early February 1935, while in March she steamed up the Yangtze as far as Hankou. After spending April and May at Shanghai, Lepanto put to sea calling at Chemulpo, Dairen, Taku, Ching-uan-tao, Ce-fu, Wei-hai-wei and Tsingtao, returning to Shanghai on 24 August. The ship then remained in the Chinese port until February 1936 for major maintenance work; after that, awaiting an improvement in wind and current (time spent carrying out exercises and gunnery trials), she steamed up the Yangtze again. After a stop at Nanjing for the Christmas holidays, during which she was visited by the Italian ambassador, Lepanto returned to Shanghai in April; then, instead of making a summer cruise, she served as a station ship for some months at Tsingtao, returning to Shanghai in September 1936.

After the departure, during 1935, of the scout cruiser Quarto, Carlotto and Lepanto remained for two years the only Italian ships in China, active mainly on the Yangtze, on the Huangpu and at Shanghai. From 1937 to 1938, as the Second Sino-Japanese War broke out, the light cruiser Raimondo Montecuccoli was sent to the Far East as a command ship, replaced from 1938 to 1939 by Bartolomeo Colleoni.

On 7 July 1937, following the Marco Polo Bridge Incident, part of the crews of Lepanto and Carlotto formed a detachment tasked with defending Italian interests in China; the detachment was later joined by the San Marco Battalion from Tientsin. These units guarded the international concessions of Shanghai to defend them from the Japanese advance in the battle that led to the Japanese occupation of the city between September and November 1937. The commander of Lepanto, frigate captain Vittorio Bacigalupi, was placed in command of the first detachment formed with men from the two gunboats.

During her stay at Shanghai, the local Italian community presented the officers and petty officers of Lepanto with a "Ricordo della Campagna in Estremo Oriente", embroidered by hand on silk. In 1937–1938 the gunboat was repeatedly on the Huangpu. On 10 April 1937 Lepanto arrived at Shanghai, from where she departed on 14 April, reaching Nanjing the next day and leaving on 22 April for Kichow, where she arrived two days later. On 26 April the gunboat left Kichow for Hankow, where she arrived the same day, departing on 2 May; she then called at Juijiang (2 May), Woosog (arrived 7 May, departed 9), Fuzhou (arrived 14 May, departed 17) and finally returned to Shanghai on 19 May, departing again on 6 July and arriving at Tsingtao two days later. Leaving Tsingtao on 15 July, Lepanto reached Chingwantao on 17 July, departing only on 10 August for Dalian, where she arrived the following day. She then reached Weihai on 13 August, departed three days later, returned to Tsingtao on 17 August, departed on 20 August and arrived at Shanghai on 22 August, but departed again on 25 August.

On 30 October 1937 Lepanto arrived at Hong Kong, from where she departed on 11 November for Haiphong, arriving on 14 November; on 18 November she arrived at Xiamen, departed the same day, and arrived at Shanghai on 29 November. In October 1938 the ship made a cruise to Japan, calling at Tokyo, Kyoto and Yokohama.

By September 1939, on the eve of the outbreak of the Second World War, Colleoni and all detachments of the Regia Aeronautica, the Guardia di Finanza and the Carabinieri were recalled to Italy: in China only Lepanto and Carlotto remained, based at Shanghai, along with the ground detachment of the San Marco Battalion. With Colleoni returning home, the flagship of the Far East Naval Command became Lepanto.

==== Second World War and the armistice ====
From 10 June 1940, the date of Italy's entry into the war, to 8 September 1943, the date of the armistice with the Allies, Lepanto and Carlotto lay almost inactive at Shanghai (where the ocean liner Conte Verde was also interned from June 1940), taking part in no combat action. Lepanto was commanded by frigate captain Vittorio Bacigalupi.

In the spring of 1942 Lepanto's armament was reinforced with the addition of Carlotto's 76/40 mm stern gun, transferred to the other unit together with the corresponding ammunition.

In January 1943 it was planned to send the gunboat to Phuket, Thailand, to attempt to salvage three merchant ships that had been trapped there at the outbreak of war—motor ships Volpi and Sumatra and the steamship XXVIII Ottobre—and had subsequently scuttled themselves, but Lepanto was found unsuitable for the mission.

At the time of the armistice, on 8 (9 in China) September 1943, Lepanto was moored at the buoys off the French Concession in Shanghai, alongside Carlotto, starboard side to starboard side. Carlotto had her bow facing north (and Lepanto therefore faced south). The ship's commanding officer was corvette captain Giuseppe Morante, while the executive officer, lieutenant Guglielmo Stevens, was temporarily commanding the local detachment of the San Marco Battalion, replacing the commander of that unit, Major (Medical Corps) Del Pra, who was temporarily absent.

On 9 September 1943 (in Italy, because of the time zone difference, it was still the 8th) the Chief of Staff of the Regia Marina, Admiral Raffaele De Courten, ordered all Italian ships in the Far East by means of a "PAPA" telegram (Precedenza Assoluta sulle Precedenze Assolute) to reach a neutral port, or, if that was not possible, to scuttle themselves. Since the three Italian ships at Shanghai could not reach a neutral port, captain Giorgio Galletti, who was substituting for Captain Prelli (commander-in-chief of Italian naval forces in China), who was in Japan at the time, ordered them to be scuttled. Conte Verde scuttled first, capsizing onto her side, and immediately afterwards, between 07:00 and 07:30, Lepanto and Carlotto also scuttled. After remaining inactive at the Italian naval base in Tianjin since 1940, Lepanto was scuttled at her moorings by her own crew. The sinking of the three ships was greeted by the crews with a shouted salute, repeated three times.

At 02:10 (or 03:00) on the night of 9 September, Morante was informed of the armistice by Captain Galletti. Lepanto's commander therefore ordered the only officer remaining aboard Lepanto—since Stevens was ashore with the San Marco Battalion, while Major (Paymaster) Benenti, the only other officer, was in Japan with Captain Prelli—the ship's chief engineer, Captain (Naval Engineers) Rodolfo Brusadin, to encipher and transmit two telegrams drafted by Galletti: the first announced the armistice and recommended maintaining discipline; the second ordered personnel to remain aboard the ships and inside the barracks. At four in the morning Lepanto's radio station, activated for that purpose, intercepted Pietro Badoglio's proclamation announcing the armistice; and at 05:00 (other sources give 06:10) Morante and Carlotto's commander, Lieutenant De Leonardis (summoned aboard Lepanto when Galletti arrived), intercepted and deciphered Supermarina's order to scuttle units that could not reach a neutral or Allied port ("Da Supermarina a Comando Superiore Navale E. O. – Tutte le navi italiane che non possono raggiungere porti inglesi od americani siano immediatamente autoaffondate"). At 05:15 Morante ordered Brusadin to begin preparations for scuttling; meanwhile Galletti returned aboard and, updated by Morante on the latest developments, confirmed the order to scuttle (the two gunboats had enough fuel only to move a short distance from Shanghai, too little to avoid search by Japanese units, given their low speed and poor seakeeping). The sinking was to take place after destroying secret archives and funds and landing personnel not required for the scuttling. Assisted by the third-class chief mechanic Umberto Menegatti, Brusadin prepared and tested the flooding of the engine room and the two horizontal magazines, opening all hatches, both horizontal and vertical. Morante then ordered Brusadin to destroy the secret archive by fire (but it is not certain that the order was actually carried out) and ordered the third-class ship's purser Tripepi to withdraw the currency kept in the safe and prepare to go to the Italian consulate. Morante then boarded a motor sampan together with Galletti, who told him to say to the Japanese that the scuttling order came from Rome and from him (Morante). Reaching shore, Morante went aboard Conte Verde and ordered that ship's commander, Corvette Captain Chinca, to scuttle the liner when the gunboat hoisted the signal "Alfa", and to tell the Japanese that the order had been given from Rome and by Morante himself (Chinca asked for a written order; Morante replied that the Alfa signal would remain ashore as proof of the order). Galletti left the gunboat at six in the morning.

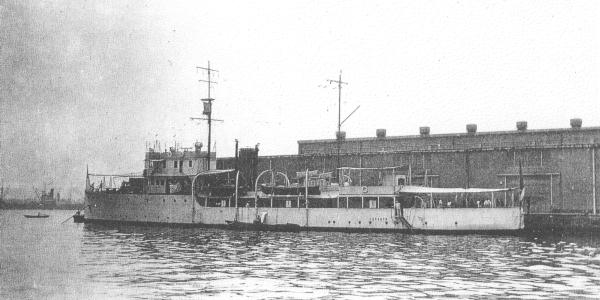
Lepanto at Yokohama on 18 April 1938.

Returning aboard Lepanto, Morante ordered a general assembly. During the brief meeting, Brusadin, foreseeing the consequences, tried to persuade the commander not to scuttle the ship, and De Leonardis asked Morante to discuss the situation rather than proceed immediately with scuttling. Morante nevertheless ordered the scuttling to proceed and the flag to be hoisted ashore (De Leonardis asked Morante to inform him of the moment when Lepanto would sink to avoid accidents, since the ships were moored side by side). Morante then, privately, ordered Chief Menegatti to take personal charge of the scuttling. Brusadin, assisted by Menegatti, opened all valves for flooding and then also the inspection hatch of the condensers. Morante went aft, directing the landing of the crews of Lepanto and Carlotto: the disembarkation had to occur without arousing Japanese suspicion, and Morante encountered difficulties given the lack of boats and the crews' desire to land as quickly as possible. Meanwhile, as the interior flooded rapidly, Lepanto slowly listed to starboard until she pressed against Carlotto, then righted again, continuing to sink very slowly. Noting that Conte Verde was capsizing and fearing that Japanese soldiers might board shortly, Morante told Brusadin he intended to set the gunboat on fire if she did not sink within a few minutes. Morante was the last to go ashore, with the water only inches below the portholes, and after Brusadin had assured him she would sink at any moment. On reaching shore, Morante had Brusadin, the boatswain and the two petty officers on watch (Menegatti and a sergeant mechanic) disembark and ordered them to go to the Italian consulate; he then reached Conte Verde by motor sampan to supervise the disembarkation of the women of the crew, and then returned to Lepanto to set her alight, since the gunboat was still afloat. De Leonardis also came, as Carlotto did not appear to be sinking either. As soon as Morante arrived, however, he saw water beginning to pour in through the aft portholes and abandoned his plan: the gunboat was listing dangerously, forcing both commanders to abandon their ships and return to the sampan. Shortly afterwards Lepanto abruptly raised her bow, broke the moorings to Carlotto and fell onto her port side, sinking. It was about seven in the morning. The whole operation, from opening the valves to complete submergence, had taken only a few minutes. Morante then returned to Conte Verde, where he was arrested by Japanese troops together with Commander Chinca and the liner's chief engineer Mayer. Lepanto's scuttling prevented that of Carlotto: as Lepanto sank she came to rest on the bottom on her port side, while her starboard side (from which the side light remained above water) ended up beneath Carlotto's hull, which settled on top of her and could not sink further.

All personnel, as ordered, assembled in the courtyard of the Italian embassy building, accompanied by Brusadin. After the capture, Commander Morante (who in the afternoon, escorted by Japanese soldiers, was taken—together with De Leonardis—to the barracks where the other men had been assembled), the officers and crews of Lepanto and Carlotto and the San Marco Battalion detachment stationed in Shanghai were first rounded up and disarmed and then temporarily interned in the San Marco barracks on Robinson Road. Between 11 and 12 September some officers, including Morante and Brusadin, and a petty officer, Chief Mechanic Camiciottoli (chief engineer of Carlotto), were separated from the rest of the personnel, taken to Hannen Road prison and subjected to various interrogations intended to prove that the scuttling had been organized before 9 September. Most of Lepanto's crew, like that of Carlotto and the men of the San Marco Battalion (and excluding almost all the officers, except Lieutenant Stevens and a few others), agreed to collaborate with the Japanese forces by adhering to the Italian Social Republic and taking part, as unarmed civilian workers, in the cleaning operations on the salvaged Lepanto. Brusadin, released from prison, was taken to another building occupied by Japanese forces, the Navy YMCA, where he was repeatedly questioned about construction details of Lepanto; on 8–10 November 1943 Lepanto, salvaged and repaired, was taken into dry dock, and on 15 November Brusadin and 70 sailors were taken to the yard and assigned to the ship's cleaning and refit work, which continued until 30 November. On 23 January 1944 Brusadin was imprisoned together with Morante and other officers. Meanwhile, on 2 December 1943 two petty officers (also adherents of the RSI, but judged responsible for the scuttlings), including Menegatti of Lepanto, were also imprisoned at Hannen Road together with the officers, to whom they related what had happened. Morante, Brusadin and Menegatti, together with several officers, remained in Hannen Road prison until 6 April 1944, when they were transferred to the prisoner-of-war camp of Kiangwan; other officers and sailors were later sent there, including Major Dal Pra. On 9 May 1945 the prisoners were transferred to Feng-tai near Peking; between June and July they were divided between the camps of Omori (Tokyo) and Kawasaki. After liberation on 30 August 1945, the prisoners—including Morante—were moved several times between localities in Japan and the Pacific Ocean controlled by United States forces and to hospital ships; they were also accidentally declared, in September 1945, prisoners of the United States (having been confused with those who had collaborated with Japanese forces) and were ultimately repatriated aboard the Dutch motor ship Weltevreden, which left Honolulu on 13 January 1946 and arrived at Naples a month later (Morante instead rejoined his family in China, who had also been released from imprisonment). The remainder of Lepanto's crew (like the remaining Italian military personnel in the Far East), after the end of the war and liberation, was repatriated aboard the merchant ships Marine Falcon (American) and Sestriere (Italian) in January–February 1947. Morante, for his role in the scuttling, was awarded the Silver Medal of Military Valor.

=== Imperial Japanese Navy service (1943–1945) ===
On 8 November 1943, Lepanto was refloated by Naval 1st Construction Department (海軍第一工作部, Kaigun Dai-1 Kōsaku-Bu) of the Imperial Japanese Navy (IJN). By 1 March 1944 repairs were completed, and she was registered in the IJN, and renamed Okitsu. She was sent to Mitsubishi Heavy Industries to have her armament fitted, which was finished by 14 May.

Starting 5 June, she started escorting convoys in the Shanghai area. She was fitted with radar at the Sasebo Naval Arsenal in April the following year. On 17 July 1945, she shot down three North American P-51 Mustangs and one North American B-25 Mitchell at Shanghai.

On 15 September 1945, her crew surrendered to the Republic of China, being decommissioned on 30 September.

=== Republic of China Navy service (1945–1956) ===
The ship was salvaged on 8 November 1943 by the 1st Construction Department of the Japanese Navy at Shanghai. After repair and reconstruction work had been completed in February 1944 (other sources erroneously place her salvage in that month), Lepanto entered service on 1 March in the Imperial Japanese Navy under the name Okitsu (Japanese: 興津), and was then sent to the shipyards of Mitsubishi Heavy Industries to embark the new armament, with work completed on 14 May 1944. The new armament consisted of one 76/40 mm Type 11 gun and four twin 25/60 mm 25 mm Type 96 machine guns, in addition to two depth charge launchers Type 94 and two depth-charge racks with a supply of 36 charges. According to other sources, the ship was instead armed with two 7.62 mm L40 anti-aircraft guns and ten 25 mm Type 96 anti-aircraft machine guns, in addition to the aforementioned anti-submarine armament, and was also equipped with a sonar and a Type 93 hydrophone. The standard displacement increased to 700 tons, and the crew was increased to 184 men (for other sources it remained 66 men). Speed was reduced by one knot. The ship was registered in the Japanese Navy in the Naval District of Sasebo (or Yokosuka); the ship, assigned to the Base Fleet of the Shanghai Sector (China Sector Fleet), was commanded by Lieutenant (later Lieutenant Commander) Hamazaki Chotaro.

On 14 May 1944 Okitsu began training for escort service. Serious problems soon emerged in the ship’s operation, and in early June 1944 the former chief engineer Brusadin was summoned to the shipyard before a mixed military and civilian commission: the Italian officer explained that he had also encountered such problems but had never been able to resolve them. From 5 to 14 June 1944 Okitsu escorted convoy "Ta 605" from Shanghai to Keelung (Formosa). From 24 to 30 June the ship escorted convoy "Ta 46" from Shanghai to Keelung or Kaohsiung.

At 10:25 on 3 July the gunboat left Saei (Formosa) together with the destroyer Hasu, escorting convoy 3311 (Tsoying–Moji), composed of the cargo ships Chohakusan Maru, Koryu Maru, Setsuzan Maru, Shozan Maru, Daiichi Maru, Fukuei Maru, Kaiko Maru, Nichizui Maru, Peking Maru, Yoko Maru, Daikyu Maru, Shoho Maru and Toyo Maru No. 5. At seven in the morning of the following day Yoko Maru separated from the other ships and headed for Keelung, and later the same day Shoho Maru had engine trouble and fell behind. At 5:45 on 6 July the United States Navy submarine Sealion torpedoed and sank Setsuzan Maru at position 29°57′N and 122°51′E. At 01:30 on 10 July Okitsu anchored in the waters of Shanghai.

On 11 July, at six in the morning, the gunboat departed from Shanghai, arriving at Seito (Tsingtao) at 10:40 on 19 July and departing again at ten on 20 July. At five in the afternoon on 25 July the ship arrived at Moji.

On 2 October 1944 Okitsu arrived at Sasebo. A week later Commander Hamazaki had to be hospitalized and was temporarily replaced by Lieutenant Commander Tadayoshi Sugiyama; the gunboat sailed from Sasebo the same day. The following day Okitsu was assigned to the 24th Gunboat Division, and three days later escorted a medium-sized coastal convoy to Shanghai. On 1 November Lieutenant Hamazaki resumed command of the ship, but on 5 February 1945 he was assigned to a new post aboard the destroyer Kaki; therefore on 13 February he was replaced in command of Okitsu by Lieutenant Commander Hijioka Torajiro.

On 21 March 1945 the gunboat was attacked and severely damaged by a formation of six bombers Consolidated B-24 Liberator of the 14th Air Force, off Cape Hung Hua (French Indochina), in the South China Sea. On 7 April the ship departed from Shanghai alone, and from 17 to 27 April escorted convoy "Mo 705" from Shanghai to Sasebo. At the Sasebo naval arsenal Okitsu underwent work to install a radar. On 11 May the ship left Sasebo transporting personnel destined to crew a type of explosive motorboat, the "Shinyo": the personnel were assigned to the 52nd Shinyo Unit in the Zhoushan Islands in Hangzhou Bay. Ten days later the ship left Shanghai together with the submarine chaser CH 38 bound for Tsingtao, escorting convoy "SE 27", composed of the merchant ships Neiha Maru, Kosho Maru and Koa Maru: the convoy reached its destination the following day. On 27 May Okitsu and CH 38 left Tsingtao escorting convoy "SHI 103", formed by the same merchant ships from the outbound journey plus Chohei Maru: the ships arrived at Shanghai at 13:15 on 29 May.

In June 1945 Okitsu underwent repair and refitting work; once completed, between June and July the ship escorted numerous convoys between Shanghai and Tsingtao.

On 15 August 1945, while the gunboat was in the Zhoushan archipelago, she received news of the end of the war. On 9 September, with the formal surrender of Japanese forces in China, Okitsu also surrendered and was stricken on 30 September from the lists of the Imperial Japanese Navy. Transferred in 1946 to the Republic of China Navy, the ship was renamed Sien Ning (Chinese: 咸宁) or Hsien Ning (other sources give Siang Ning or Hsienning).

According to another version, at the end of the conflict Okitsu passed under the control of Chinese forces on 15 August 1945 at Zhoushan, entering service in the Nationalist Chinese Navy under the name Sien Ning (for another source Yen Ning.). Other sources place the surrender in August 1945 and the incorporation into the Chinese Navy as Sien Ning in 1946, while others state that the ship surrendered not to Chinese forces but to those of the United States.

According to some sources, in 1949, following the defeat of Nationalist China by the communist forces of Mao Zedong, the Sien Ning, together with the remnants of the Chinese Nationalist fleet, moved to Formosa. According to another version, probably erroneous, in 1949 the gunboat was captured by Chinese communist forces, thus entering service in the People's Liberation Army Navy.

In July 1950 the Sien Ning captured a British merchant ship. Decommissioned and stricken from the naval register in 1956, the vessel was sent for scrapping the same year.

== Gallery ==
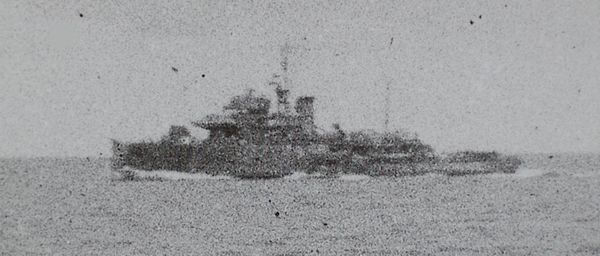
IJN Okitsu on 18 June 1945

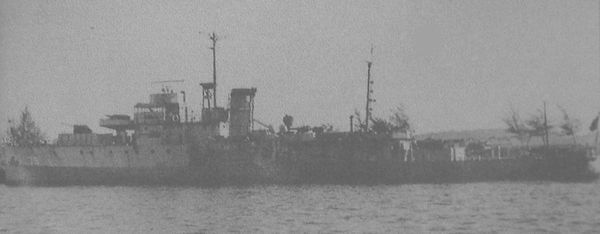
ROCS Hsien Ning around 1956

== Bibliography ==
- "Rekishi Gunzō"., History of Pacific War Vol. 51, The true histories of the Imperial Japanese Vessels Part 2, Gakken (Japan), June 2002, ISBN 4-05-602780-3
- Ships of the World special issue Vol. 47, Auxiliary Vessels of the Imperial Japanese Navy, "Kaijinsha"., (Japan), March 1997
- The Maru Special, Japanese Naval Vessels No. 45, Japanese gunboats, "Ushio Shobō". (Japan), November 1980
