= UCOCAR =

State-owned shipyard in Venezuela

Unidad Naval Coordinadora de los Servicios de Carenado, Reparaciones de Casco, Reparaciones y Mantenimiento de Equipos de y Sistemas Buques
- Native name: Spanish: Unidad Naval Coordinadora de los Servicios de Carenado, Reparaciones de Casco, Reparaciones y Mantenimiento de Equipos de y Sistemas Buques
- Company type: State-owned company
- Industry: Shipbuilding, Defence
- Predecessor: Dique y Astillero Nacional de Puerto Cabello
- Founded: November 28, 1990; 35 years ago
- Headquarters: Puerto Cabello, Carabobo, Venezuela
- Area served: Venezuela
- Key people: VA Hamilton Coll Perdomo (CEO)
- Products: Warships, merchant vessels, pontoons
- Owner: Venezuelan Ministry of People's Power for Defense
- Website: www.ucocar.gob.ve

UCOCAR (Spanish: Unidad Naval Coordinadora de los Servicios de Carenado, Reparaciones de Casco, Reparaciones y Mantenimiento de Equipos de y Sistemas Buques) is a state-owned shipyard in Venezuela, which is responsible for the repair, maintenance, construction of ships and equipment, systems, hull, structures related to ships up to 8,000 tons, in support of the National Bolivarian Armed Forces of Venezuela, Public and Private Organizations. The company is mainly built ships for Bolivarian Navy of Venezuela.
