= Damen Stan Lander 5612 =

Class of landing craft

Roll-on Roll-off 5612
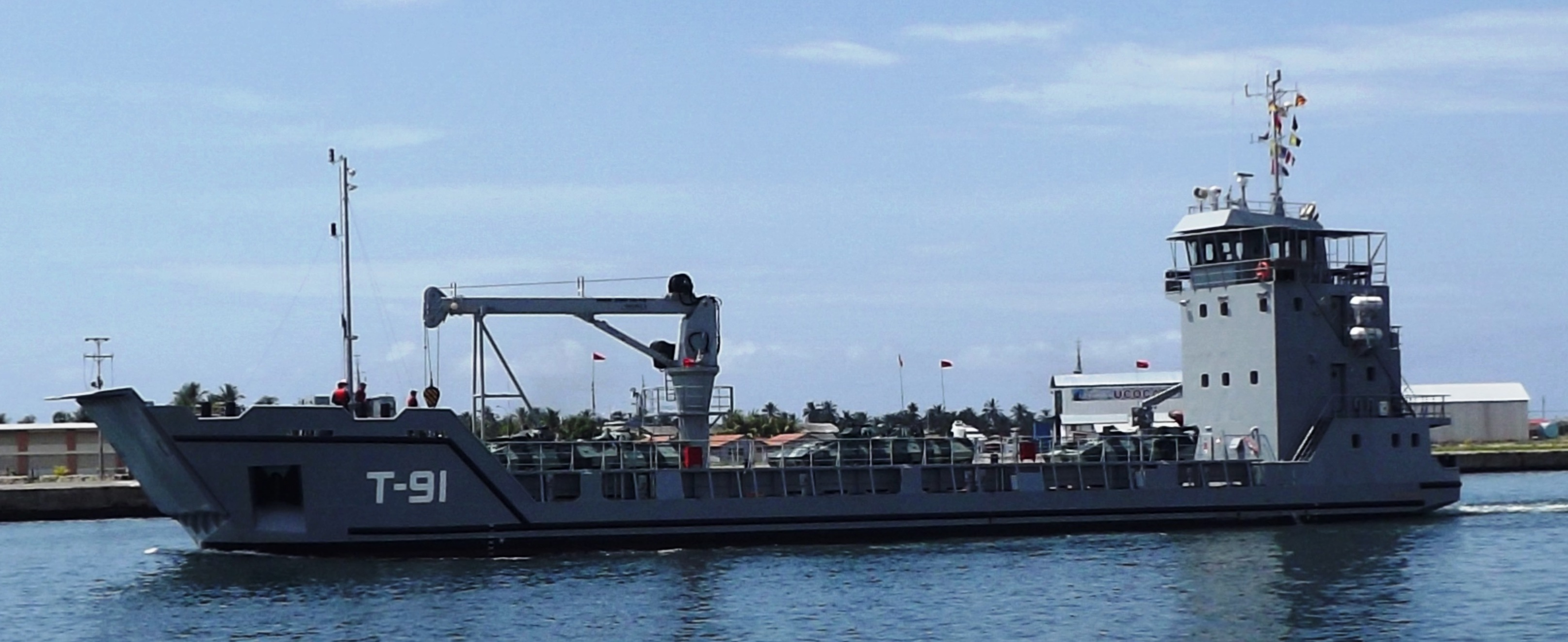
- The Venezuelan AB Los Frailes

History
- Name: Roll-on Roll-off® 5612
- Owner: Damen Shipyards Group
- Status: Active

General characteristics
- Class & type: Logistic support and Disaster Relief Vessel
- Displacement: 700 t (max deadweight)
- Length: 57.27 m (187 ft 11 in)
- Beam: 12.00 m (39 ft 4 in)
- Draught: 2.95 m (9 ft 8 in)
- Propulsion: 2× MTU 12V2000M61/1A diesel engines (1200 bkW), 2× Reintjes WAF 464L gearboxes, 2× 1700 mm propellers, 1× Veth VT-150 bow thruster
- Speed: 11 knots (at 325 t deadweight)
- Complement: 16 (1 captain cabin, 1 officer cabin, 7 double cabins)
- Sensors & processing systems: JRC radar, Alphabridge nav system, Alphatron gyro & autopilot, JRC GPS, AIS, echosounder, speedlog
- Notes: Deck crane: 14T at 19.5m, Capstan: 3T, 2× anchor winches (10m/min), 2× anchors (1192kg each)

The Damen Stan Lander 5612 (or Damen RoRo 5612) is a class of landing craft designed by Damen Group. The designation is based on the class's size of more than 57m in length and 12m as its beam.

The class equipped with a large loading crane, and can be used to transport dozens of standard-sized shipping containers. It has a landing craft-style bow loading ramp for wheeled vehicles, and it can carry a mixture of shipping containers and wheeled vehicles. It is designed with 16 crews.

The Bahamas, Bolivia, Venezuela, Panama and Vietnam are the operators of the class.

Some Damen Stan Lander 5612
Name	Country	Operator	Commission	notes
Presidente Manuel Amador Guerrero	Panama	National Aeronaval Service	May 2018	
AB Los Frailes	Venezuela	Bolivarian Navy of Venezuela	April 2012	
AB Los Testigos	Venezuela	Bolivarian Navy of Venezuela		
AB Los Roques	Venezuela	Bolivarian Navy of Venezuela		
AB Los Monjes	Venezuela	Bolivarian Navy of Venezuela	December 14, 2018	
HMBS Lawrence Major	Bahamas	Royal Bahamas Defence Force	March 18, 2016	
526	Vietnam	Vietnam People's Navy	October 21, 2021	
527	Vietnam	Vietnam People's Navy	October 21, 2021	
528	Vietnam	Vietnam People's Navy	October 21, 2021	
529	Vietnam	Vietnam People's Navy	October 21, 2021	
