= Bolivarian Navy of Venezuela =

- Armada Bolivariana de Venezuela
- Coat of Arms of the Navy
- Founded: 1811; 215 years ago
- Country: Venezuela
- Type: Navy
- Role: Defense of Venezuela's coastline and maritime and inland waters
- Size: 1 submarine 1 frigate 12 patrol boat 4 landing ship tank 3 auxiliary ship
- Part of: National Armed Forces of Venezuela
- Patron: Virgen del Valle
- Mottos: Navigare necesse, vivere non necesse (Latin: "Sailing is necessary, but living is not".)
- Colors: Navy blue
- March: Marcha Epica de las Fuerzas Navales (English: "Grand March of the National Navy")
- Anniversaries: July 24, Birthday of Simon Bolivar, Navy Day and Battle of Lake Maracaibo Anniversary
- Engagements: Venezuelan War of Independence and the Battle of Lake Maracaibo

Insignia
- Naval ensign

- Naval jack

- Flag

The Bolivarian Navy of Venezuela (Spanish: Armada Bolivariana de Venezuela), commonly known as the Venezuelan Navy, is the naval branch of the National Bolivarian Armed Forces of Venezuela.

== History ==
The Venezuelan Navy was born as a coastal defense force during the beginning of the Venezuelan War of Independence. In May 1810, Commander Lino de Clemente, a veteran officer of the Spanish Navy who joined the April 1810 coup against the colonial government, was appointed the first Minister of Defense of the republic and began the building of the armed forces including the formation of the navy.

For a long time their vessels, even if obsolete, were maintained properly by its sailors. In 1937 the Navy acquired from Italy two gunboats of the Azio class and rechristened them General Soublette and General Urdaneta. These ships remained in service until 1951, other sources state 1948 or 1950,) and were scrapped later.

=== 2000s - 2026s ===
In September 2008, the Russian Navy's nuclear-powered missile cruiser Pyotr Velikiy, accompanied by three other ships of Russia's Northern Fleet, sailed from its base in Severomorsk on a cruise to the Caribbean Sea for a joint exercise with the Venezuelan Navy. This action represented the first major Russian power projection in the region since the end of the Cold War. Additional ships included the anti-submarine warship Admiral Chebanenko, a tug boat, and supply ship.

=== Crisis in Venezuela ===
During a 2019 crisis in Venezuela, the Venezuelan Navy became engaged in the conflict when it began to prevent the entry of humanitarian aid into the country. A ship departing from Puerto Rico attempted to ship aid into the Venezuelan port city of Puerto Cabello. Six vessels of the Venezuelan Navy, including the Mariscal Sucre-class frigate Almirante Brion and patrol boats, were deployed to prevent the entry of the aid shipment. The ship, carrying civilians, returned to Puerto Rico after the Venezuelan Navy threatened to "open fire" on the humanitarian ship. Governor of Puerto Rico Ricardo Rossello, who ordered the return of the ship, stated that the act by the Venezuelan Navy was "unacceptable and shameful" and that Puerto Rico "notified our partners in the U.S. government about this serious incident".

On 30 March 2020, the Venezuelan patrol boat Naiguatá sank after a collision with the polar ice class cruise liner RCGS Resolute, while in international waters. According to RCGS Resolute's owner, the Coast Guard ship had fired shots and ordered the cruise ship to follow it to Margarita Island, a Venezuelan harbour. Naiguatá sank following the collision, with RCGS Resolute informing the international Maritime Rescue Coordination Centre (MRCC) of the incident and offering assistance. After staying in the area for an hour, RCGS Resolute was informed through MRCC that assistance was not required as Naiguatá's crew had been rescued by the Venezuelan Navy.

According to the Portuguese after-incident investigation, RCGS Resolute had departed Buenos Aires on 5 March and sailed to the Caribbean Sea. She was contacted by Venezuelan patrol boat Naiguatá on the night of 30 March. Two hours later, an unexpected change in Naiguatá's heading just before the collision may have been caused by a suction effect between the vessels as the faster patrol boat passed the bow of the cruise ship. Although the collision may have not been intentional ramming, the conclusion was nonetheless that the incident that led to the sinking of Naiguatá was a deliberate act initiated by the Venezuelan Navy rather than an accidental occurrence.

=== Naval crises with the U.S. Navy ===
In the fall of 2025, following the 7 August 2025 United States Department of Justice raising the reward for the arrest of Venezuelan president Nicolás Maduro to US$50 million, the United States began a series of escalating activities against the maritime sector of Venezuela, including a number of targeted attacks on Venezuelan vessels carrying cargo toward U.S. waters. On 10 December 2025, the U.S. Coast Guard seized the Venezuelan oil tanker Skipper in international waters, off the Venezuelan coast; but the Bolivarian Navy did not intervene. The vessel was boarded by armed Coast Guard personnel who descended from a helicopter. The operation was executed after a U.S. Federal judge authorized the seizure due to the tankers role in transporting sanctioned oil from Venezuela and Iran. Maduro had previously been indicted by a US federal court in 2020 and is accused of narcoterrorism and conspiracy to import cocaine to the United States.

On 16 December 2025, U.S. President Trump announced a complete blockade of all sanctioned oil tankers going into and out of Venezuela. No clear statement of what the Bolivarian Navy would do in response followed.

== Organization of the Navy ==
As of 2024, Admiral Neil Jesús Villamizar Sánchez was the Commanding General of the National Navy.

=== Naval Operations Command ===
The Naval Operations Command is commanded by the Chief of Naval Operations. In 2014, this was Vice Admiral Antonio Díaz Clemente.

==== Venezuelan Naval Aviation ====
Venezuelan Naval Aviation serves as the air arm of the Venezuelan Navy, with responsibility for air operations and transport for the entire Navy.

==== Coast Guard ====
Headquartered in La Guaira, Vargas, the Venezuelan Coast Guard is responsible for the surveillance of Venezuela's jurisdictional waters.

== List of current and former ships ==
Class	Image	Type	Ships	Origin	Note
Submarine (1)
Type 209		Diesel-electric	S-31 Sábalo (1976); S-32 Caribe (1978)	Germany	1,810 tonnes. At least one vessel is believed to be operational as of 2025.
Mini-submarine (1)
VAS 525		Mini-submarine with reversible DC electric motor	N/A	Italy	100+ tonnes. A diver transport minisub was in use with the Venezuelan Navy.
Frigate (1)
Mariscal Sucre class		Missile frigates	F-22 Almirante Brion	Italy	2,506 tonnes
Offshore patrol vessel (6)
Guaiquerí-class patrol boat		Offshore patrol vessels	PC-21 Guaiquerí; PC-23 Yekuana; PC-24 Kariña (PC-22 Warao out of service since 2012 after grounding incident)	Spain	2,419 tons
Guaicamacuto class		Offshore patrol vessels	GC-21 Guaicamacuto; GC-22 Yavire; GC-24 Comandante eterno Hugo Chávez (GC-23 Naiguatá sunk on 30 March 2020)	Spain	1,453 tons
Gunboat (3 in service)
Constitución class		Gunboat	PC-11 Constitución; PC-12 Federación; PC-13 Independencia; PC-14 Libertad; PC-15 Patria; PC-16 Victoria	United Kingdom	173 tons. Total of 6 boats in inventory but only 3 speculated to remain in service.
Patrol boat (2+)
Págalo class		Patrol boat	PG-51 Págalo; PG-52 Caricare	Netherlands	
Peykaap III-class missile boat		Fast patrol craft	N/A	Iran	
Amphibious ship and service ship (10)
Los Frailes class		Service ship	T-91 Los Frailes; T-92 Los Testigos; T-93 Los Roques; T-94 Los Monjes	Cuba	
Capana class		Landing Ship Tank	T-61 Capana; T-62 Esequibo; T-63 Goajira; T-64 Los Llanos	South Korea	1 ship reported non-operational. 1 ship damaged.
Ciudad Bolívar class		Supply ship	T-81 Ciudad Bolívar	South Korea	
Punta Brava class		Oceanographic ship	BO-11 Punta Brava	Spain	
Bricbarc type Simón Bolívar		Training sailboat	BE-11 Simón Bolívar	Spain	

== Fleet forces and Coast Guard ship organization ==
=== Light frigates ===
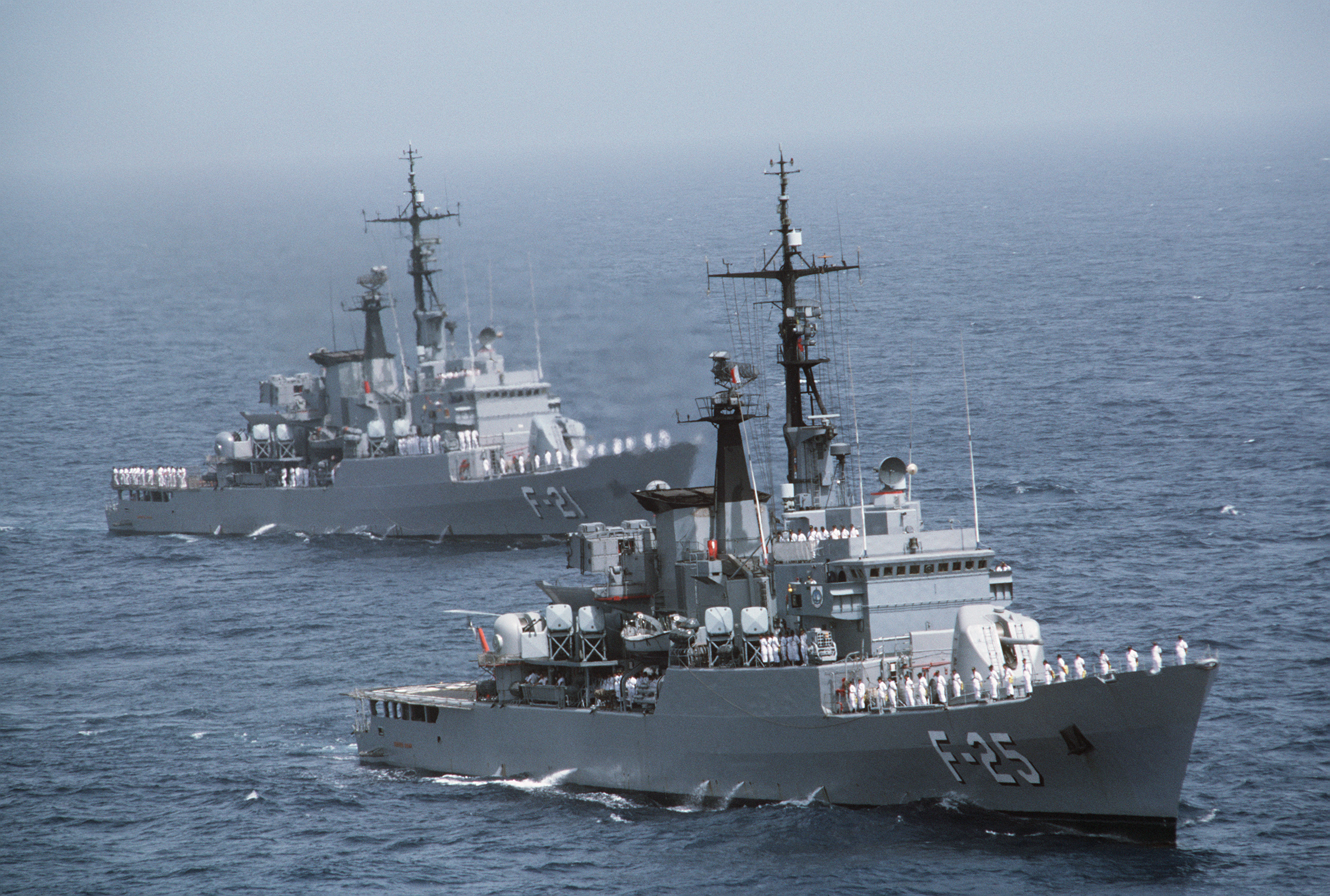
Venezuelan frigates General Salóm (foreground) and Mariscal Sucre conduct maneuvers

- One Lupo/Mariscal Sucre-class missile frigates class
  - F-22 Almirante Brion, in service 1981

=== Offshore patrol vessels ===
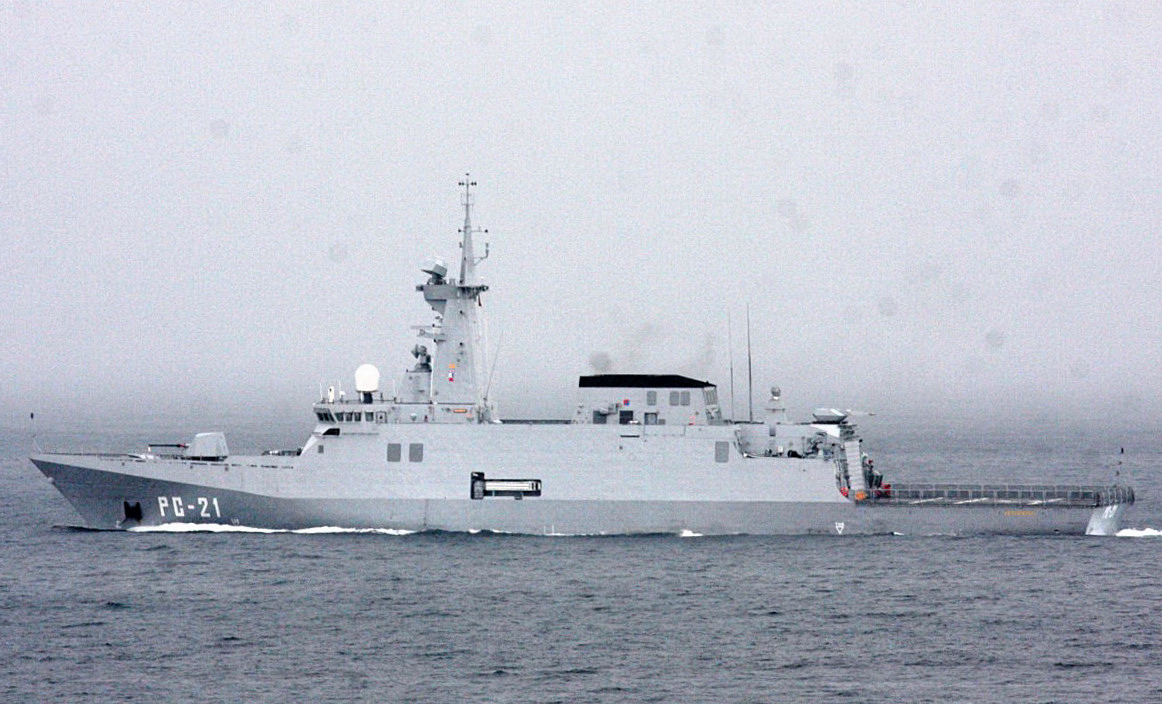
PC-21 Guaiquerí

- Four Spanish-made offshore patrol vessels of the Guaiquerí class. One ship, PC-22 Warao is out of service. It was taken to Fortaleza, Brazil following a grounding incident in 2012, and subsequently to Rio de Janeiro.
  - PC-21 Guaiquerí, in service as of 2011
- Four Spanish-made offshore patrol vessels of the Guaicamacuto-class patrol boat. One ship, GC-23 Naiguatá, was sunk after it rammed a cruise ship in 2020.
  - GC-21 Guaicamacuto, was in service as of 2011. Current operational status unknown.

=== Amphibious and service ships ===
- Four Capana-class LST.
  - T-61 Capana, into service 1983, as of 2001.
  - T-64 Los Llanos, into service 1983, was still in service as of 2001.
- One Ciudad Bolívar-class supply ship.
  - T-81 Ciudad Bolívar, was in service in 2001
- One Bricbarc type/Simón Bolívar training sailboat.
- One Almirante Francisco de Miranda-class tugboat

=== Coast guard ships ===
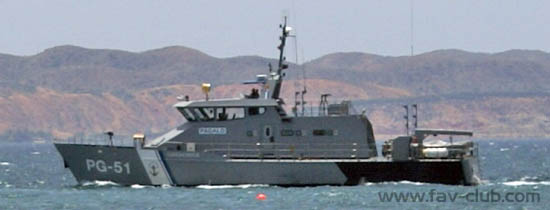
PG-51, a Damen Stan 2606

In 2006, Venezuela had four patrol boats, 2 more Venezuelan-built by 2008, and perhaps some others which are not verified. It is unclear how many, or if any, are still operational in 2023.

- Four USCG Point-class patrol boats, as of 2006.
- Damen Stan 2606 vessels, built in Venezuela, similar to the United States Coast Guard's Marine Protector class, as of 2008. One already in service by 2008, plus 1 more completed by 2008. Up to 5 more might be built.

=== Naval aviation assets ===
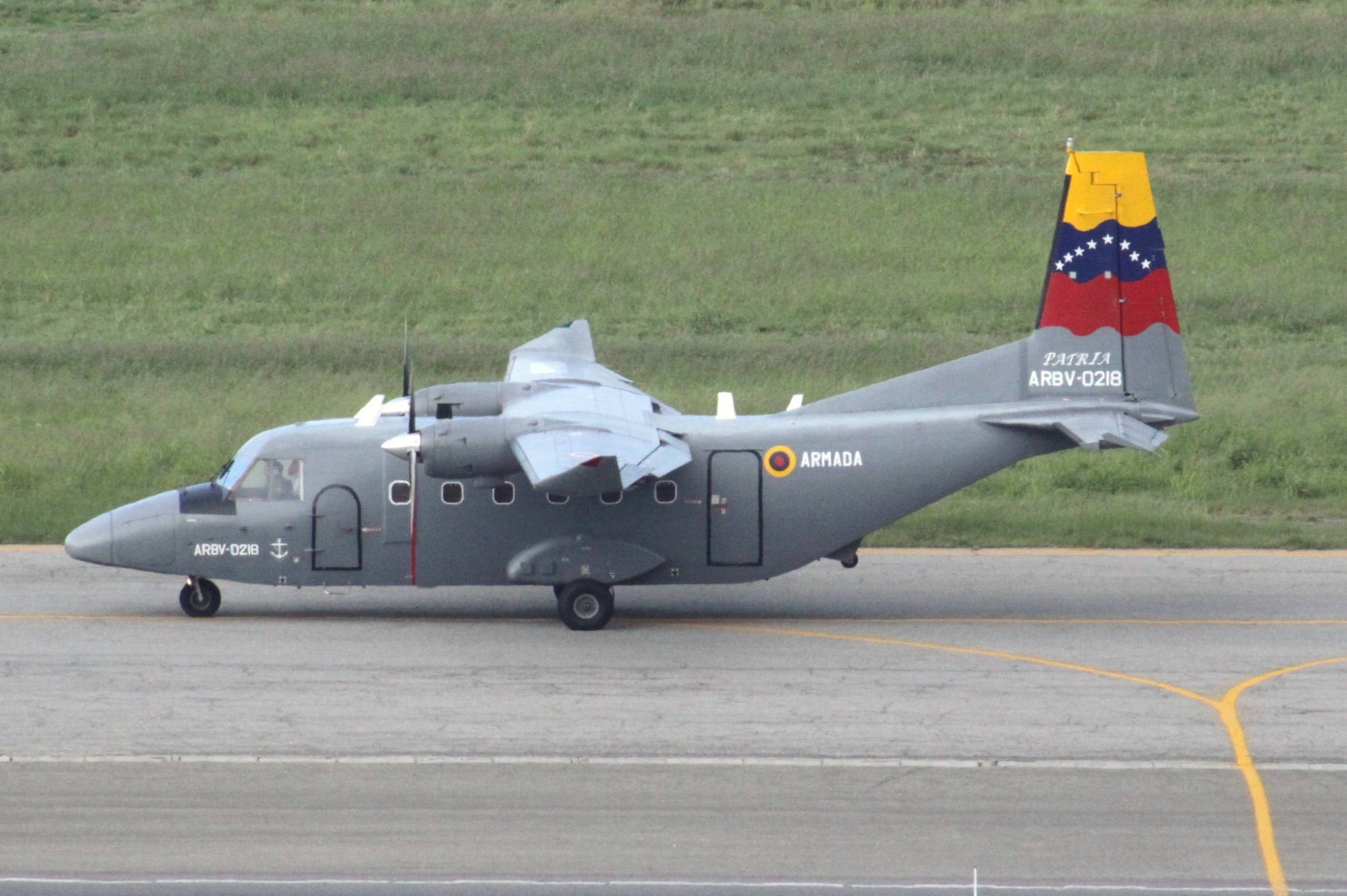
CASA 212

==== Airplanes ====
Aircraft	Origin	Type	Versions	In service as of 2020	Notes
CASA C-212	Spain	Maritime patrol/transport aircraft	C-212-200S43 Patrullero C-212-400	2 3	
Beechcraft Super King Air	United States	Transport/liaison aircraft	B200; B90	1	
Cessna 208 Caravan	United States	Transport aircraft		1	
Turbo Commander	United States	Transport aircraft		1	

==== Helicopters ====
Aircraft	Origin	Type	Versions	In service as of 2012	Notes
Mil Mi-17	Russia	Assault/transport helicopter	Mi-17V-5	6	
Bell 206	United States	Training light helicopter	TH-57A	3	
Bell 212	United States	Assault/transport helicopter		9	

== Ranks ==
=== Commissioned officer ranks ===
The rank insignia of commissioned officers.

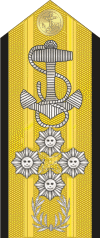
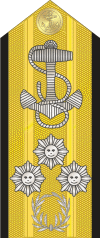
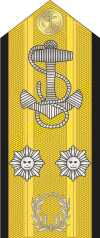
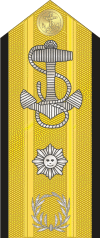
Rank group	General / flag officers				Senior officers			Junior officers
Bolivarian Navy of Venezuela
Bolivarian Navy of Venezuela	Almirante en jefe	Almirante	Vicealmirante	Contraalmirante	Capitán de navío	Capitán de fragata	Capitán de corbeta	Teniente de navío	Teniente de fragata	Teniente de corbeta

=== Other ranks ===
The rank insignia of non-commissioned officers and enlisted personnel.

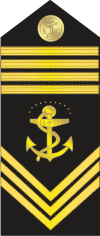
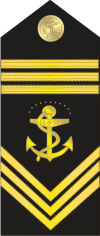
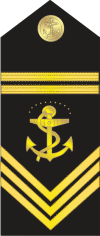
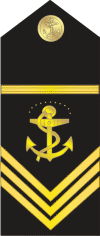
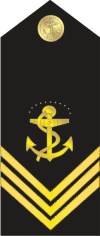
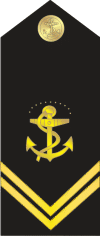
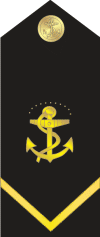
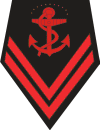
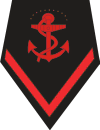
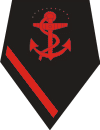
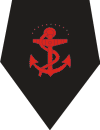
Rank group	Senior NCOs							Junior NCOs		Enlisted
Bolivarian Navy of Venezuela
Bolivarian Navy of Venezuela	Sargento supervisor	Sargento ayudante	Sargento mayor de primera	Sargento mayor de segunda	Sargento mayor de tercera	Sargento primero	Sargento segundo	Cabo primero	Cabo segundo	Distinguido	Marinero raso

== See also ==
- Venezuelan Marine Corps
