= HMBS Lawrence Major =

Support vessel

HMBS Lawrence Major is a support vessel operated by the Royal Bahamas Defence Force. She was built in the Netherlands by The Damen Group, to an adaptation to its Damen Stan Lander 5612 design.

The vessel is named after the first commander of the Royal Bahamas Defence Force, Lawrence Whitfield Major.

The vessel is 56 metres (184 ft) long, and 12 metres (39 ft) wide. She has a landing craft style forward ramp, allowing vehicles to roll on and roll off, for amphibious delivery. She is equipped with a 25-ton crane. She is also designed to securely carry mission modules the size of standard shipping containers, allowing a mix of missions. The modules include emergency kitchens, and hospital modules, for responding to disasters. Stan Lander 5612 vessels can carry up to 42 containers, in the deckspace that would otherwise be available to carry vehicles. Damen designed this class for a crew of 16.

She was delivered to the Bahamas on March 18, 2016, together with three smaller patrol vessels.

== Operational history ==
On 22 April 2016 Lawrence Major transported a fire engine to Crooked Island.
