= Guaiquerí-class patrol boat =

Class of ocean patrol vessels operated by the Venezuelan Navy

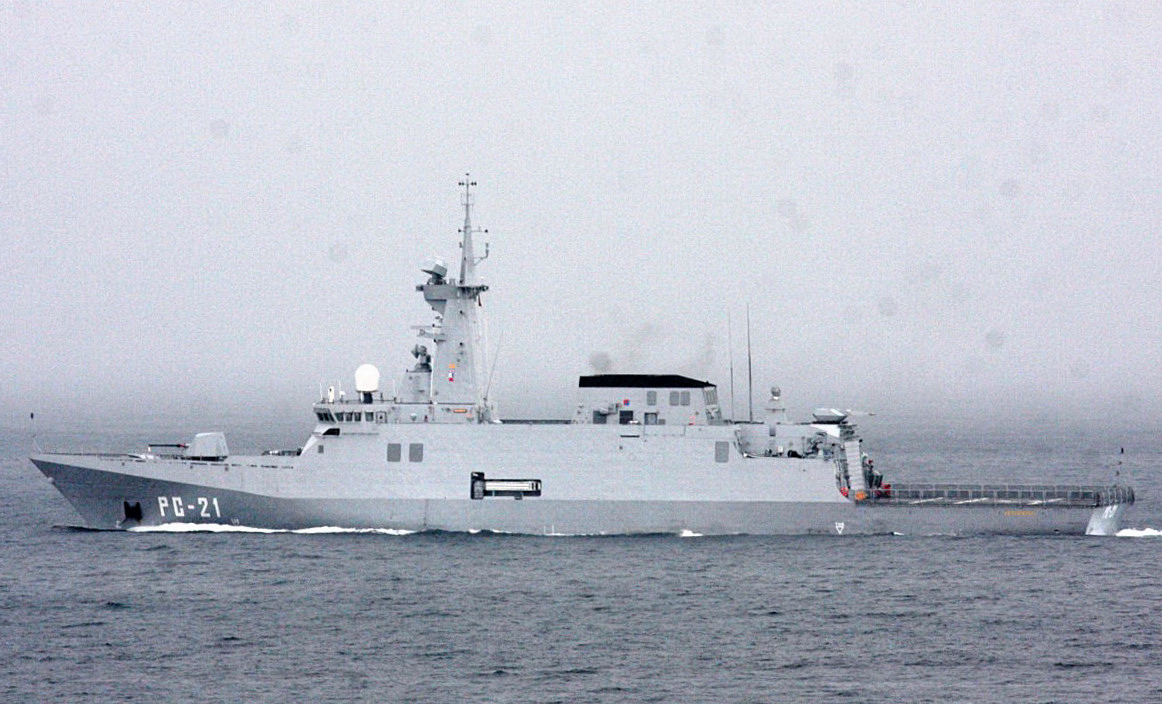
- PC-21 Guaiquerí

Class overview
- Builders: Navantia, Cádiz, Puerto Real Yard
- Operators: Bolivarian Navy of Venezuela
- Planned: 4
- Completed: 4
- Active: 3
- Lost: 1

General characteristics
- Type: Patrol boat
- Displacement: 2,419 tons
- Length: 99 m (325 ft)
- Beam: 13.6 m (45 ft)
- Propulsion: CODAD, 4 × MTU 12V-1163-TB93 rated at 4,440 kW (5,950 hp) each; 2 × shaft with Wärtsilä 5C11 controllable pitch propeller
- Speed: Maximum: 24 knots (44 km/h; 28 mph); Cruising: 22 knots; Economy: 18 knots
- Range: 3,500 nmi (6,500 km; 4,000 mi) at 18 knots (33 km/h; 21 mph)
- Complement: 60 + 32
- Sensors & processing systems: Thales SMART-S Mk-2 multifunction radar; Thales Mirador EOTS; Thales Vigile 100 ESM; Thales Scout Mk2 LPI; Thales Sting 1.2; Thales TACTICOS CMS
- Armament: 1 × Oto Melara 76 mm ('A' position); 1 × Oerlikon Millennium 35 mm Naval Revolver Gun System; 2 × 12.7 mm machine guns
- Aviation facilities: Flight deck, hangar

The Guaiquerí-class patrol vessels (Avante 2200 Patrol) are a class of ocean patrol vessels or POVZEE (Spanish: Patrullero Oceánico de Vigilancia de la Zona Económica Exclusiva) in Venezuelan Navy service. The lead ship were originally intended to have the pennant F-31 and name of Guaicaipuro but has since been renumbered.

== History ==
The POVZEE vessels feature stealth technology with reduced radar and infrared signatures as well as special design to minimize the propulsion system's noise emissions and vibrations. An aft hangar and flight deck enables operation of a single rotary-wing aircraft. The ship carries two small semi-rigid boats RHIB for rescue and transport purposes.

The first ship, Guaiquerí was launched by Spanish state-owned shipbuilder, Navantia, at their Cádiz shipyard on 24 June 2009.

On 3 August 2012, Warao grounded on a reef off Fortaleza, Brazil, when arriving for the joint exercise "VenBras-2012" with the Brazilian Navy. She was assisted by sister Kariña and refloated by Brazilian tugboats. The hull and propulsion system were heavily damaged and it was decided to repair her in Brazil with assistance from Navantia. In March 2013 she arrived at the naval dockyard at Rio de Janeiro aboard Dutch heavy-lift dock Rolldock Sea. Warao was transported to Venezuela in 2016, where it remains unrepaired at a pier, in a non-operational state (as of 2020).

On 31 March 2016, the accidental discharge of a cannon on Guaiquerí left at least one dead and six injured.

== Ships of class ==
Name	Pennant	Laid down	Launched	Commissioned	Fate
Guaiquerí	PC-21	11 September 2008	24 June 2009	14 April 2011	
Warao	PC-22	12 May 2009	3 November 2009	August 2011	out of service after grounding incident in 2012.
Yekuana	PC-23	22 September 2009	1 March 2010	9 December 2011	
Kariña	PC-24	17 February 2010	—N/a	January 2012	
