= AB Los Monjes =

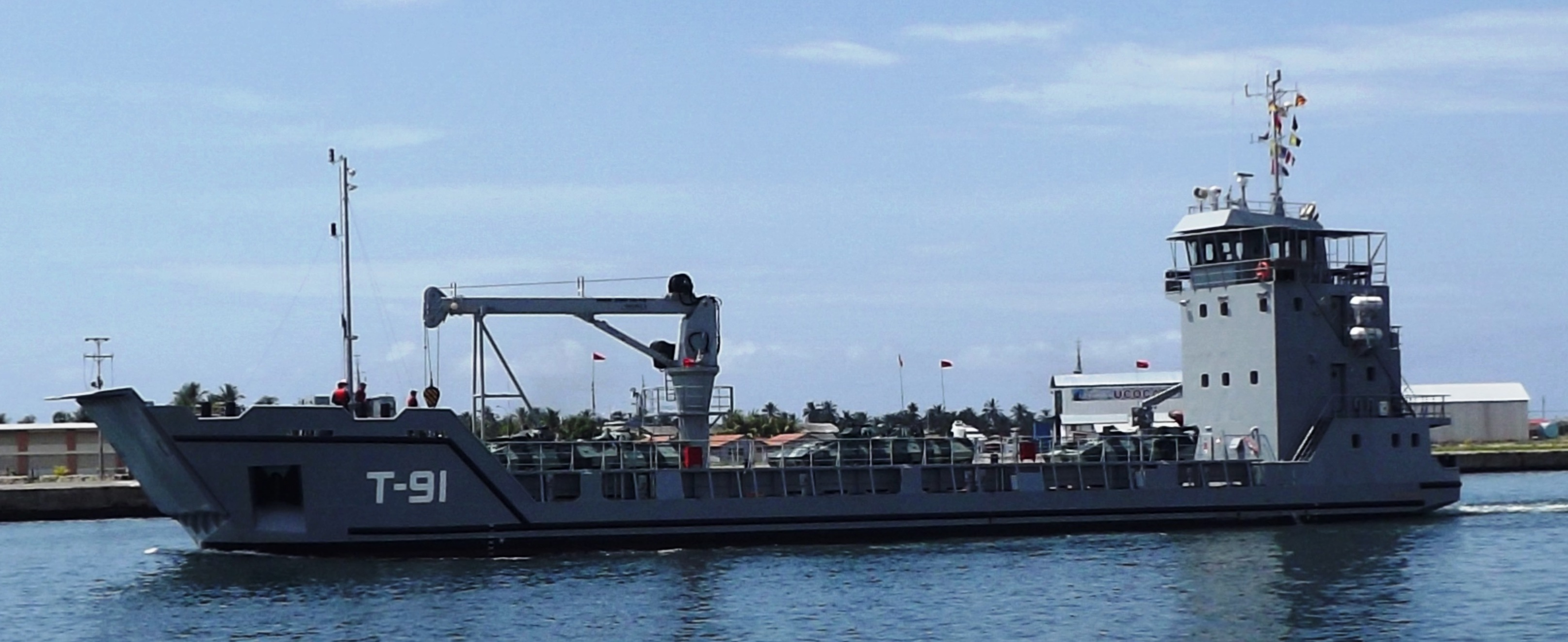
- Sister ship Los Frailes

History

Venezuela
- Name: Los Monjes
- Builder: Damen Group
- Acquired: December 14, 2014
- Identification: T-94

General characteristics
- Class & type: Damen Stan Lander 5612 landing craft
- Complement: 16

AB Los Monjes (T-94) is the fourth of four Damen Stan Lander 5612 landing craft Venezuela ordered from Dutch shipbuilding firm the Damen Group. They were built in one of Damen's shipyards in Cuba. Her sister ships are the AB Los Frailes, AB Los Testigos, and AB Los Roques.

They were designed for a crew of 16. This class of vessel is designed to carry vehicles, or standard sized shipping containers. They carry a large crane for handling deck cargo, like shipping containers. Operators can prepare a special set of containers which can be transported to set up various kinds of temporary facilities. The Royal Bahamas Defence Force had a special set of containers containing a portable hospital, so it lander, HMBS Lawrence Major could provide disaster relief.

Los Monjes was delivered to Venezuela on December 14, 2014.
