= HSwMS Trossö =

Swedish ice-strengthened patrol craft tender

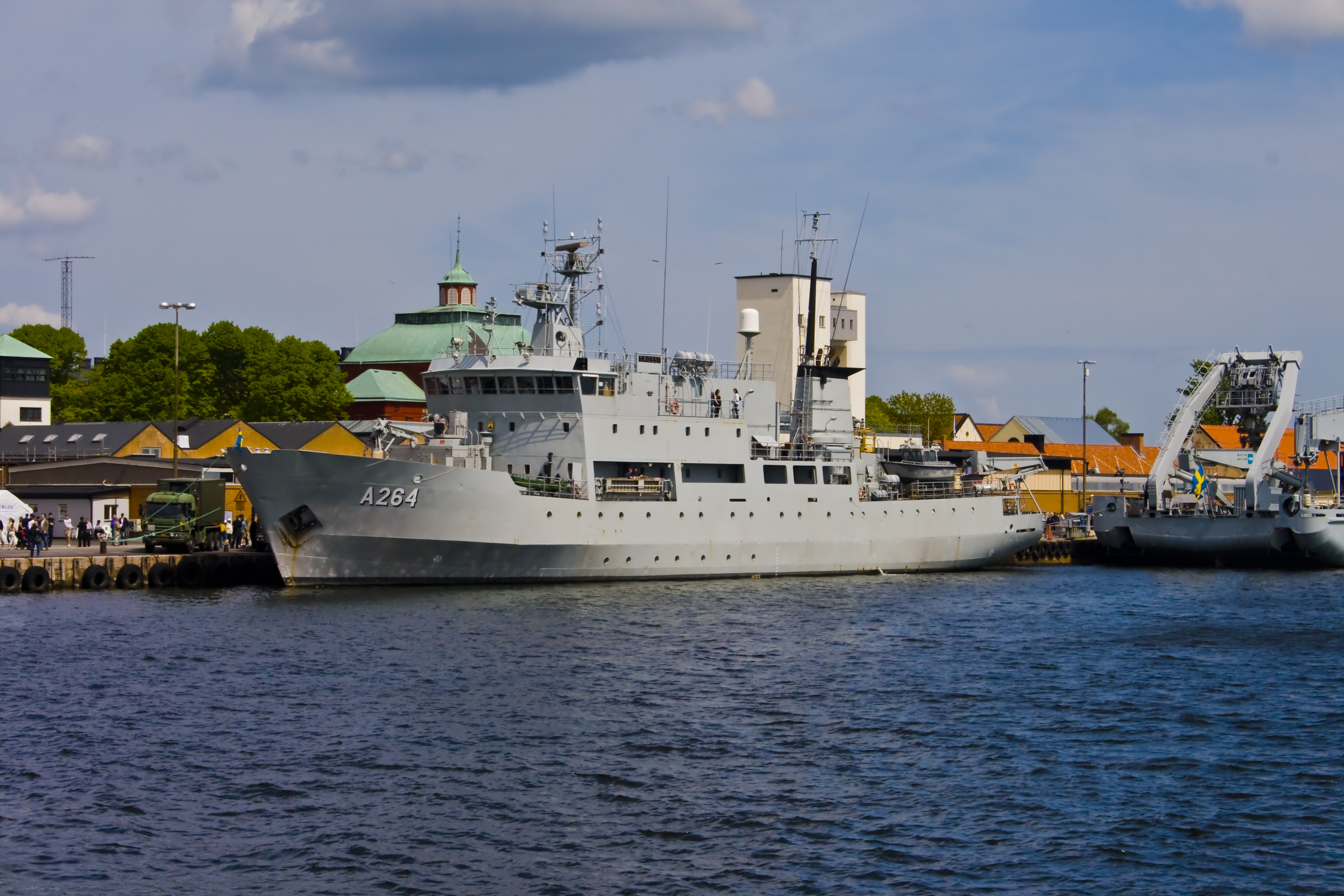
- HSwMS Trossö

History

Sweden
- Name: Trossö; Livonia (1991–1998); Arnold Veymer (1984–1991)
- Namesake: Swedish island Trossö
- Builder: Oy Laivateollisuus Ab, Turku, Finland
- Launched: 1984
- Acquired: 1997
- Commissioned: 1998
- Identification: IMO number: 8119027; MMSI number: 265837000; Callsign: SGFQ
- Badge

General characteristics
- Class & type: Akademik Shuleykin-class research vessel
- Displacement: 2,140 t (2,110 long tons)
- Length: 71.6 m (234 ft 11 in)
- Beam: 12.8 m (42 ft 0 in)
- Draft: 4.5 m (14 ft 9 in)
- Propulsion: 2 × diesel engines, 3,000 hp (2,200 kW)
- Speed: 14 knots (26 km/h; 16 mph)
- Complement: 61 men, including 27 enlisted
- Armament: Machine guns

HSwMS Trossö (A264) is an auxiliary ship in the Swedish Navy. She was built in Finland for the Soviet Navy as an Akademik Shuleykin-class ice-strengthened patrol craft tender, launched in 1984 as Arnold Veymer and renamed Livonia in 1991. Her sister ships were Akademik Shuleykin, Akademik Gamburtsev, Professor Molchanov, Professor Multanovskiy, Geolog Dmitriy Nalivkin, Professor Polshkov, Professor Khromov and Akademik Shokalskiy.

== History ==
Arnold Veymer, named after Arnold Veimer, was built in Finland in 1984 for the Soviet Academy of Sciences as an oceanographic ship. She was transferred to Estonia to carry out marine research in the Baltic Sea and in the Atlantic.

The Swedish Navy bought the ship from Estonia in September 1996 and she entered service in 1998 as HSwMS Trossö (A264). She was refitted in 2003 at Falkvarv, Falkenberg and now serves the 4th Naval Warfare Flotilla as a support ship. She also serves as a command ship during larger exercises.

In 2008, together with HSwMS Stockholm and HSwMS Malmö, she was included in the Swedish naval force of the Operation Atalanta, deployed off the Somali coast to fight piracy. On 21 October 2009 the ship returned to Karlskrona. The home transportation was done with the semi-submersible heavy-lift ship, MV Eide Transporter.
