= Action of 19 May 2009 =

Failed Somalian attack on a Greek cargo ship

- Part of Operation Atalanta
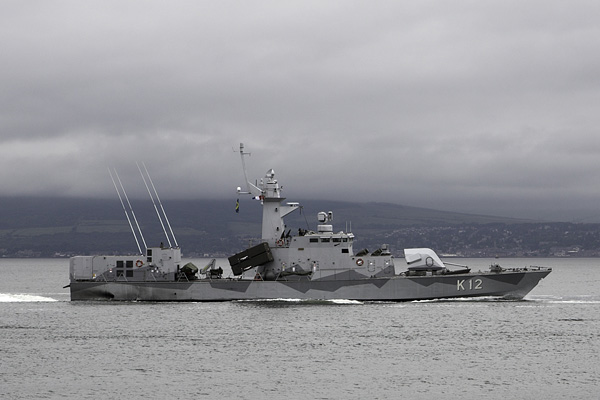
- Image of the HSwMS Malmö (P12) of the Swedish Navy, taken 28 days after the incident.
Date	May 19, 2009
Location	Gulf of Aden
Result	Greco-Swedish victory

Belligerents
Sweden; Swedish Navy; Greece	Somali Pirates

Commanders and leaders
Magnus Jönsson	Unknown

Units involved
HSwMS Malmö (Greece) M/V Antonis	Unknown

Strength
1 ship At least 7 soldiers	2 boats At least 7 pirates

Casualties and losses
None	7 Pirates captured 2 guns captured

The Action of 19 May 2009 was a confrontation between the HSwMS Malmö of the Swedish Navy and Somali Pirates in the Gulf of Aden after the pirates attempted to seize a Greek cargo vessel. The commander of the HSwMS Malmö was Magnus Jönsson.

== Background ==
Shortly before 1.30 AM on May 19, 2009, the HSwMS Malmo and HSwMS Stockholm were ordered to respond to a mayday signal sent out by the Greek cargo ship M/V Antonis, the crew of the cargo ship had said that they came under rocket-propelled grenade fire from the pirates.

== Action ==
When the HSwMS Malmö arrived, the crew saw the pirates attempting to board the cargo ship, upon which it fired warning shots with cannons, machine guns, and snipers in an attempt to thwart the attack. In response, the pirates reportedly fired a grenade launcher, but spokesman Anders Grenstad claimed nobody was injured.

When the pirates attempted to escape, the HSwMS Malmö began chasing them, and focusing on one of their boats. After about 20 minutes the pirates gave up and a Swedish crew of around 7 soldiers was sent to arrest them.

The 7 pirates on board one of the fishing boats were arrested and taken onboard the HSwMS Malmö while security forces boarded the fishing boat and documented the items, finding 2 guns, a GPS navigator, and a grappling hook.

== Aftermath ==
The pirates were later taken to Djibouti where an agreement between the EU and Kenya was signed where pirates arrested by EU forces are taken to Kenya to face trial. After the Swedes interrupted the attempted hijacking, there were fewer pirate attacks in the area, making Magnus Jönsson to say that he believed the Swedish intervention had some impact.
