= Turku shipyard =

Name Turku shipyard usually means either of the following yards in Turku, Finland:

- Crichton-Vulcan (1924–1989); from 1965 Wärtsilä Turku Shipyard; discontinued in 1989
- Perno shipyard (1976 –), also known as Wärtsilä Perno Shipyard, Kværner Masa-Yards Turku New Shipyard, Aker Turku Shipyard, STX Turku; currently operated by Meyer Turku

Other yards of Turku area:

- Turun Veneveistämö, Turku boat works
- Pansio shipyard (1945–1987)
- Laivateollisuus (1945−1988)
- Turku Repair Yard, located in Luonnonmaa island, Naantali
- Navire
- Ab Vulcan (1898–1924)
