= Akademik Shuleykin-class research vessel =

Finnish-built ice-strengthened ships built for the USSR

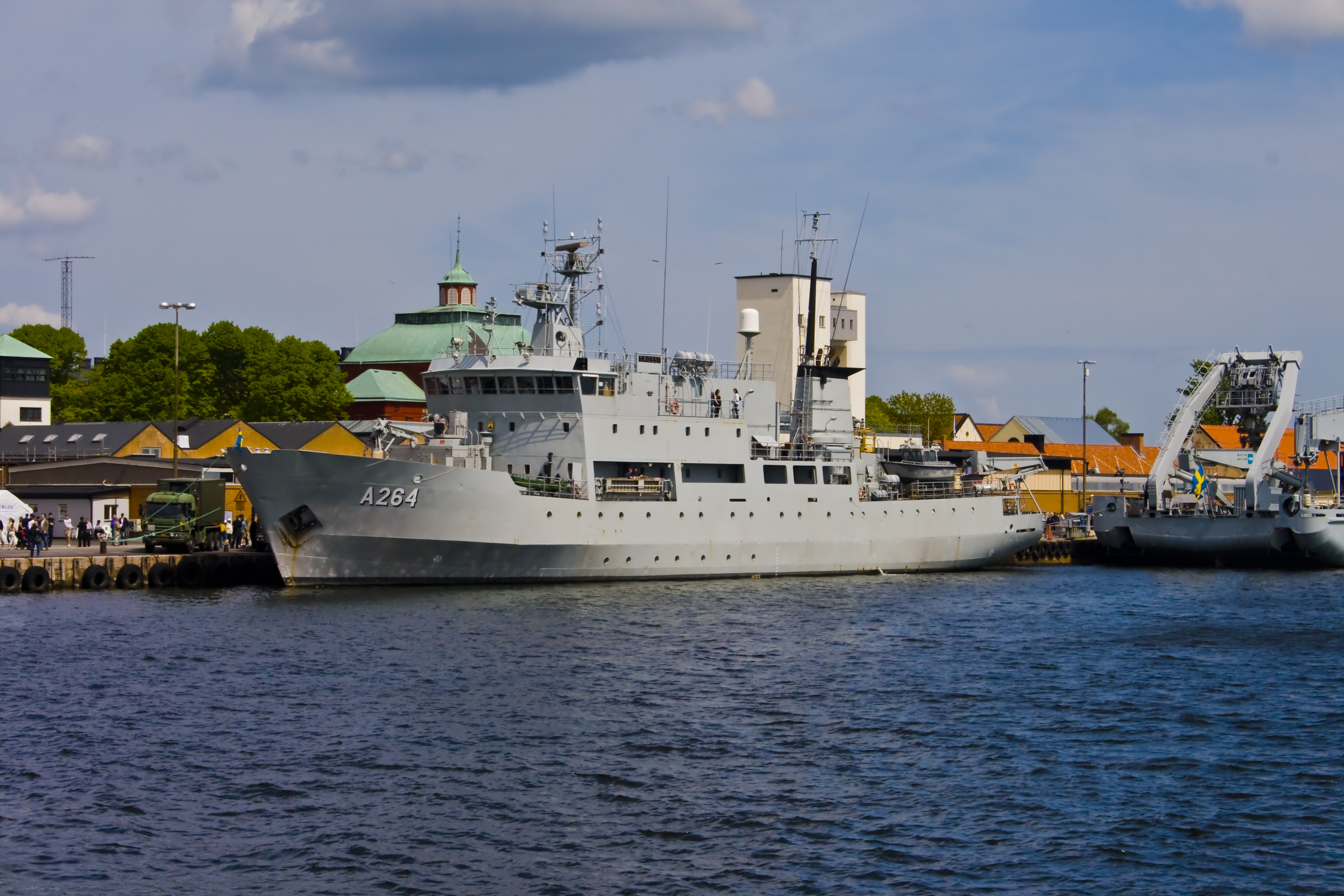
- Arnold Veimer as HSwMS Trossö in Swedish Navy service

Class overview
- Name: Akademik Shuleykin class (Project 637)
- Builders: Valmetin Laivateollisuus Oy, Turku, Finland
- Operators: Soviet Navy; Swedish Navy
- Completed: 10
- Active: 9
- Scrapped: 1

General characteristics as built
- Type: Ice-strengthened research vessels
- Tonnage: 1,753 GRT
- Displacement: 2,140 t (2,110 long tons)
- Length: 71.6 m (234 ft 11 in)
- Beam: 12.8 m (42 ft 0 in)
- Draft: 4.5 m (14 ft 9 in)
- Depth: 6.45 m (21 ft 2 in)
- Propulsion: 2 × diesel engines, 3,120 hp (2,330 kW)
- Speed: 10–14 knots (19–26 km/h; 12–16 mph)
- Endurance: 70 days

The Akademik Shuleykin class consists of a series of Finnish-built ice-strengthened ships constructed for the USSR. Originally used for oceanographic research, several of these vessels have been converted for tourism in Arctic/Antarctic waters, accommodating approximately 50 passengers.

== Ships in class ==
- Akademik Shuleykin 1982 IMO: 8010324; renamed Polar Athena (now converted for arctic tourism);
- Akademik Shokalskiy, 1982 IMO: 8010336 (1998 converted for tourism)
- Professor Molchanov, 1982 IMO: 8010348 (converted for tourism)
- Professor Khromov, 1983 IMO: 8010350; renamed Spirit of Enderby (now converted for tourism)
- Professor Multanovskiy, 1983 IMO: 8010362 (converted for tourism)
- Akademik Gamburtsye, 1983 IMO: 8118994; 1997 renamed Fregat; 2003 renamed Nordsyssel (used by the governor of Svalbard); 2014 renamed Polar Surveyor (survey ship for Gardline Marine Sciences); 2020 renamed Nansen Explorer and converted to polar expedition yacht for Nansen Polar Expeditions
- Arnold Veymer, 1984 IMO 8119027; 1991 renamed Livonia; transferred to Estonia as a patrol and pollution cleanup ship, sold to Sweden and converted again (now HSwMS Trossö)
- Akademik Golitsyn, 1984 IMO: 8119003 (Академик Голицын)
- Professor Polshkov, 1984 IMO: 8119015 (scrapped 2013)
- Geolog Dmitriy Nalivkin, 1985 IMO: 8119039
