= Polar Pioneer =

Akademik Shuleykin-class oceanographic research vessel

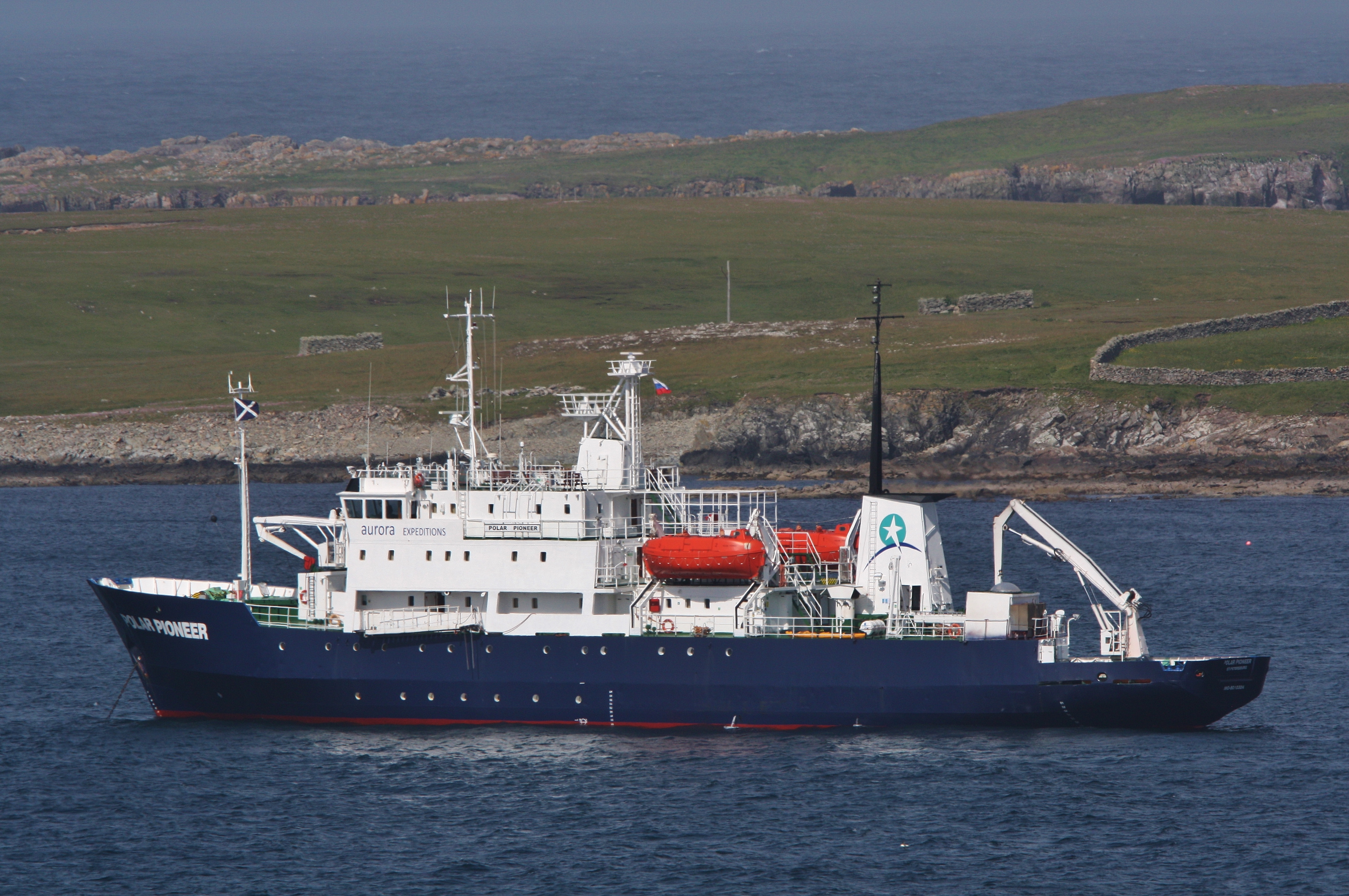
- The Polar Pioneer in Shetland

History

Cyprus
- Name: Akademik Shuleykin (1982–2001); Polar Pioneer (2001–2024); Polar Athena (2024–present)
- Owner: Unipolar Shipping Limited
- Operator: TBA
- Port of registry: Leningrad, 1982–1993; Saint Petersburg, 1993–2012; Limassol, 2021-present
- Builder: Oy Laivateollisuus Ab, Turku, Finland
- Yard number: 342
- Completed: 7 July 1982
- In service: 1982
- Identification: Call sign: 5BSP5; IMO number: 8010324; MMSI number: 210189000
- Status: Active

General characteristics
- Class & type: Akademik Shuleykin class research vessel
- Tonnage: 1,753 GT; 526 NT
- Length: 71.06 m (233.1 ft)
- Beam: 12.82 m (42.1 ft)
- Draught: 4.5 m (15 ft)
- Depth: 6.45 m (21.2 ft)
- Decks: 2
- Installed power: 2 × 6CHRNP 36/45 (6ЧРН36/45) 2,294 kilowatts (3,076 hp)
- Propulsion: 1 controllable-pitch propeller
- Speed: 26 km/h (16 mph; 14 kn)
- Capacity: 54 passengers
- Crew: 23

Polar Athena is a Finnish-built expedition cruise ship

The ship was built in Finland in 1982 as the Akademik Schuleykin (Russian: Академик Шулейкин), an ice-strengthened research ship, and for many years she plied the waters of the USSR's northern coast. In 2000 she was refurbished in St. Petersburg to provide comfortable accommodation for 54 passengers.

Her sister ships are Akademik Shokalskiy, Arnold Veymer, Akademik Gamburtsev, Professor Molchanov, Professor Multanovskiy, Geolog Dmitriy Nalivkin, Professor Polshkov, Professor Khromov.

== Specifications ==
- Length 71.61 metres
- Beam 12.8 metres
- Draft 4.5 metres
- Cruising Speed 10 knots
- Displacement 2140 tons
- Registry Cyprus
- Classification society RINA
- Equipment: Zodiacs, Kayaks, Diving (some trips), Ice Climbing (some trips), Camping (some trips).
