= R-class patrol boat =

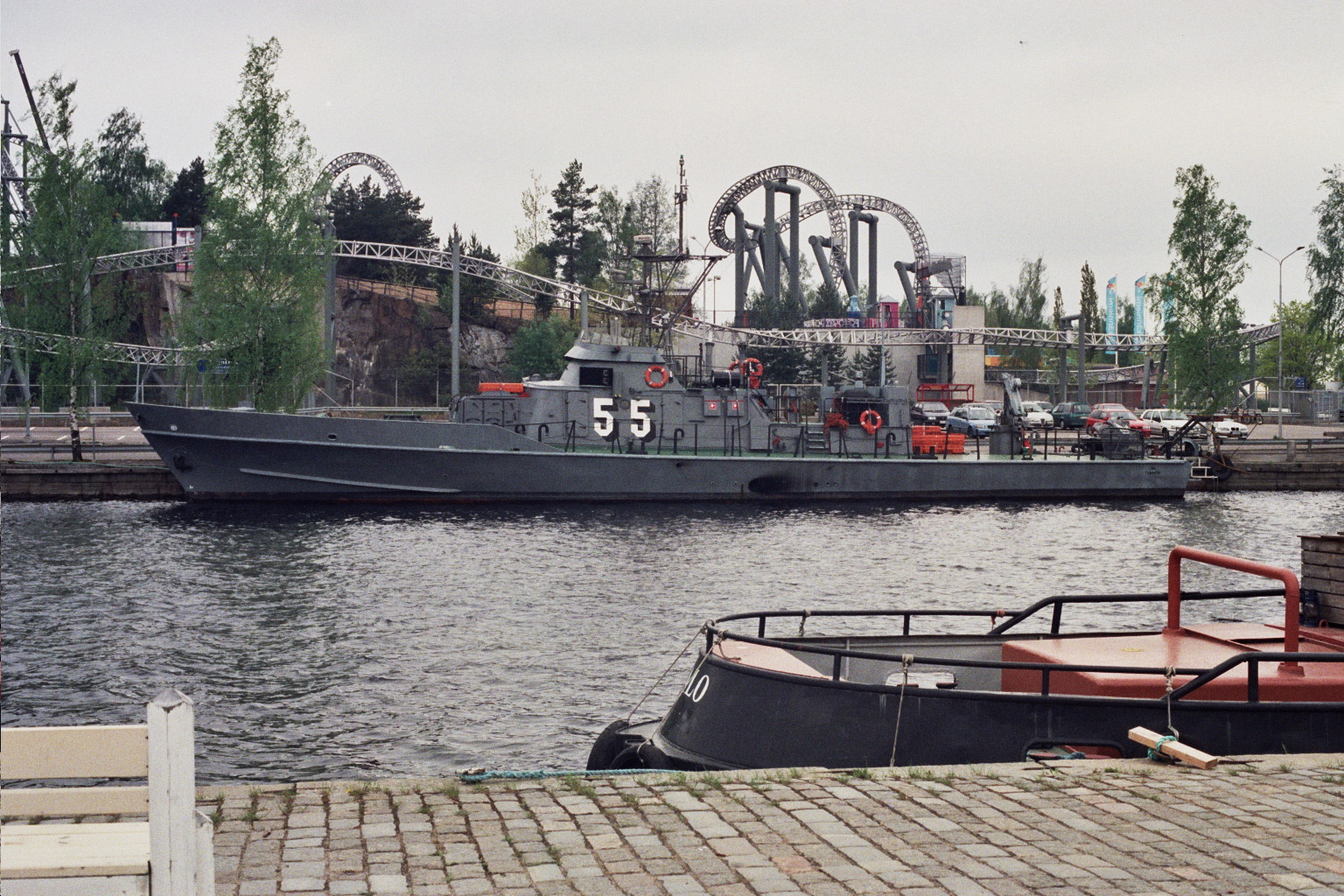
- Former patrol boat Röyttä in private ownership

Class overview
- Name: R class

General characteristics
- Type: Patrol boat
- Displacement: 51, 52: 90 tons, 110 tons full load; 53, 54, 55: 110 tons, 130 tons full load
- Length: 51, 52: 31.1 m (102 ft); 53, 54, 55: 33.0 m (108.3 ft)
- Beam: 51, 52: 5.7 m (19 ft); 53, 54, 55: 5.5 m (18 ft)
- Draught: 1.8 m (5.9 ft)
- Propulsion: 51, 52: 2 × Mercedes-Benz Diesel; 1,044 kW (1,400 hp); 53, 54, 55: 2 × Mercedes-Benz Diesel; 1,864 kW (2,500 hp)
- Speed: 51, 52: 15 knots (28 km/h; 17 mph); 53, 54, 55: 17 knots (31 km/h; 20 mph)
- Crew: 20
- Armament: 1 × 40 mm Bofors; 1 × 20 mm Madsen; 1 × Squid ASW mortar
- Notes: Ships in class include: Rymättylä (51), Rihtniemi (52), Ruissalo (53), Raisio (54), Röyttä (55)

The R-class patrol boats was a class of Finnish patrol boats, originally constructed as coastal minesweepers. They were modified into patrol boats by the end of the 1960s and transferred to the Patrol Flotilla and later to the 7th Missile Flotilla. They were then used for sea patrol and as anti-submarine warfare vessels. They were stricken from the Finnish Navy list in the 1990s. The three later vessels, Ruissalo, Raisio and Röyttä, were somewhat larger and the vessels are therefore sometimes referred to as the Rihtniemi and Ruissalo classes. However, the Finnish Navy used the designation R class for all five vessels.

The R class was much liked in the Finnish Navy, due to their low fuel consumption and their good seagoing qualities. They were in principle unsinkable (the vessels could have a list of 115 degrees without sinking and still return to upright position).

== Vessels of the class ==
- Rymättylä (51) / Suurop (P 421): Ordered in July 1955 from Rauma-Repola in Rauma, launched in 1956, and entered service on 20 May 1957. She was sold to the Estonian Navy in 1999 as the EML Suurop.
- Rihtniemi (52) / Ristna (P 422): Ordered in July 1955 from Rauma-Repola in Rauma, launched in 1956, and entered service on 21 February 1957. She was sold to the Estonian Navy in 1999 as the EML Ristna.
- Ruissalo (53): Ordered from Laivateollisuus, Turku. Taken into use on 11 August 1959. Scrapped in the early 2000s.
- Raisio (54): Ordered from Laivateollisuus, Turku. Taken into use on 12 September 1959. Sold on the private market.

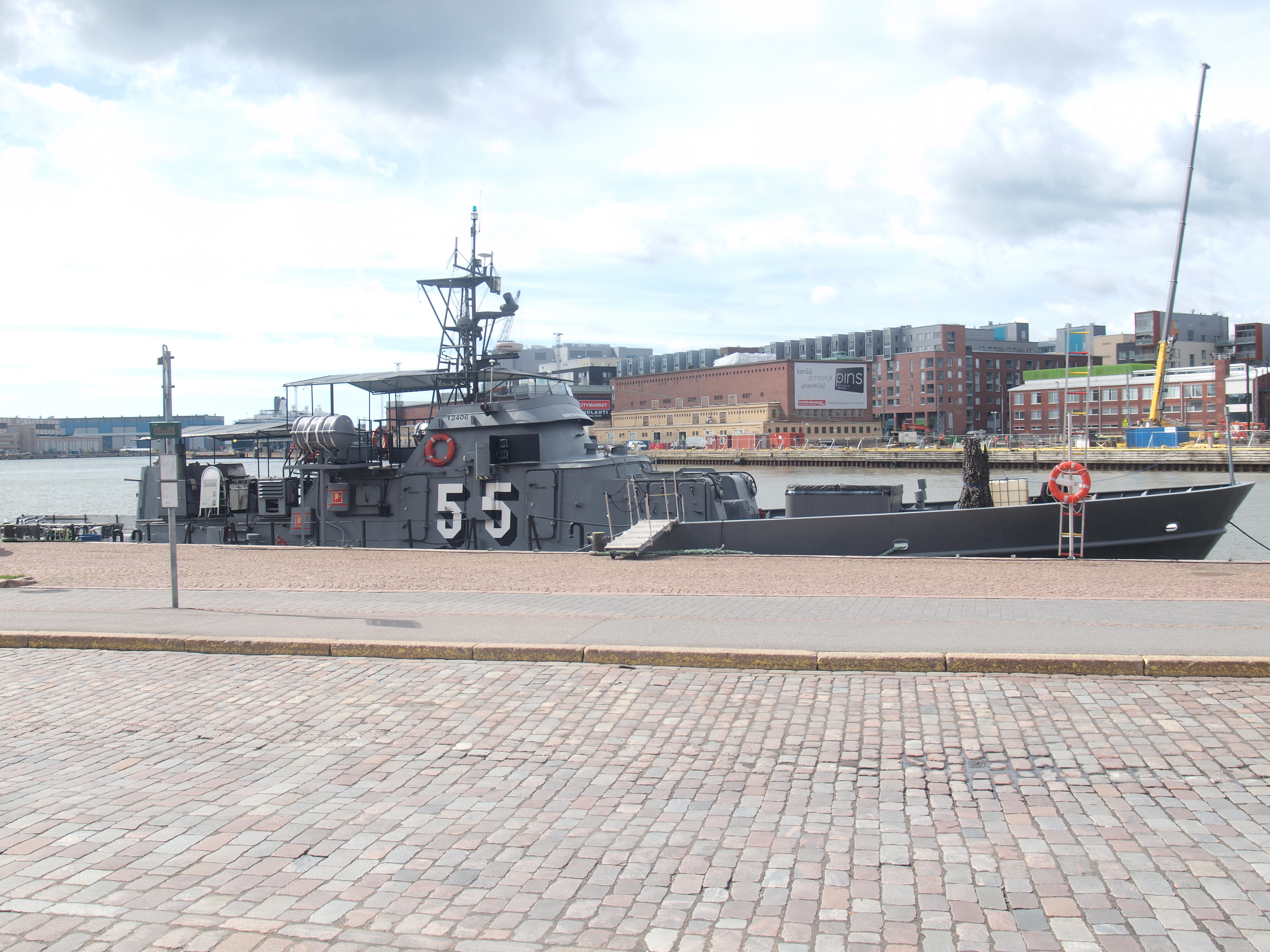
Röyttä, now known as Vartiovene 55, in her current home port Helsinki.

- Röyttä (55): Ordered from Laivateollisuus, Turku. Taken into use on 14 October 1959. Röyttä was transferred to the marine reserve training units in 2000 and is used for training. She was renovated in both 1980 and 2000. She was later sold to a private adventure company in Tampere. She currently operates as the commercial cruise ship Vartiovene 55 in Helsinki.
- Carlos Alban: Built in 1971. In use 1971-1997. Ruissalo class patrol boat, operated by the Colombian Coast Guard.
- Nito Restrepo: Built in 1971. In use 1971–1990. Ruissalo class patrol boat, operated by the Colombian Coast Guard.
- Jorge Soto del Corval: Built in 1971. In use 1971–1984. Ruissalo class patrol boat, operated by the Colombian Coast Guard.

== Operators ==
- Colombia: Three Ruissalo-class patrol boats
- Estonia: Two ex-Finnish Rihtniemi-class patrol boats
- Finland: Two Rihtniemi and three Ruissalo-class patrol boats
