= Professor Molchanov =

Oceanographic research vessel

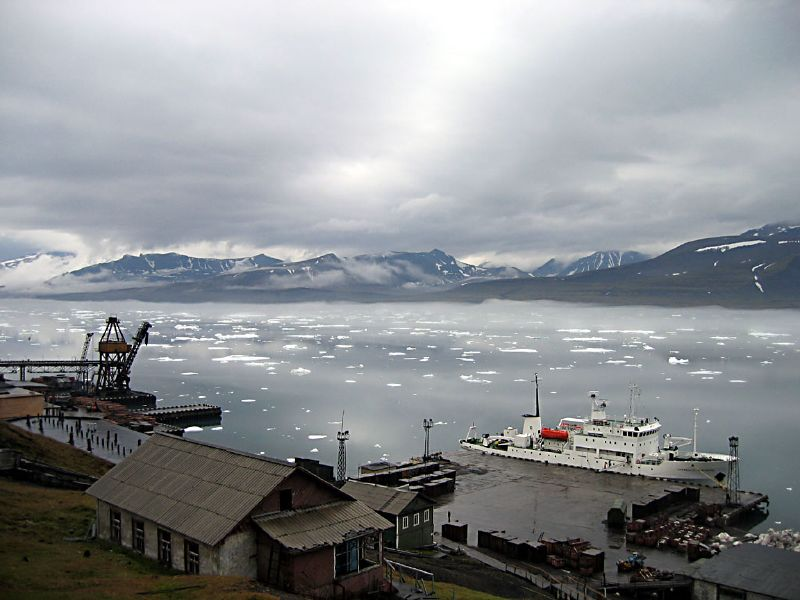
- Professor Molchanov at Barentsburg

History

Russia
- Name: Professor Molchanov
- Operator: Oceanwide Expeditions
- Port of registry: Murmansk, Russia
- Builder: Oy Laivateollisuus Ab, Turku, Finland
- Launched: 28 December 1982
- Identification: IMO number: 8010348; Callsign: UAKA; MMSI Number: 273458500
- Status: in service

General characteristics
- Class & type: Akademik Shuleykin-class research vessel; now passenger vessel
- Tonnage: 1,753 GT
- Length: 69.7 m (228 ft 8 in)
- Beam: 12.8 m (42 ft 0 in)
- Draft: 4.5 m (14 ft 9 in)
- Ice class: KM*UL(1)A2; (equivalent to Lloyds 1D)
- Installed power: 2 × diesel engines ME, 3,120 hp (2,330 kW)
- Speed: 10 knots (19 km/h; 12 mph)
- Endurance: 70 days
- Capacity: 48 passengers
- Crew: 32

Professor Molchanov (Russian: «Профессор Молчанов») is a Russian (formerly Soviet) ice-strengthened oceanographic research vessel. The ship was built in Finland in 1983 and is now converted to passenger duties for the expedition cruise market.

== History ==
=== Research vessel ===
Professor Molchanov is an Akademik Shuleykin-class ice-strengthened vessel, built in Finland for the Soviet Union. Launched on 28 December 1982, she was named after Pavel Molchanov, radiosonde inventor, on his 90th anniversary. Between 26 January 1983 and 7 September 1991, the ship was used for polar and oceanographic research. She made 34 research cruises as a Soviet research vessel, including three global hydrology expeditions held by Murmansk Hydrometeorological Administration:

- 28 April 1984–10 June 1984, through North Sea, Norwegian Sea, north-eastern Atlantic Ocean, Barents Sea
- 19 September 1989–30 November 1989, through Greenland Sea, North Atlantic Ocean, Norwegian Sea, Barents Sea
- 12 December 1989–22 February 1990, through Norwegian Sea, South Atlantic Ocean, Barents Sea, North Sea, North Atlantic Ocean

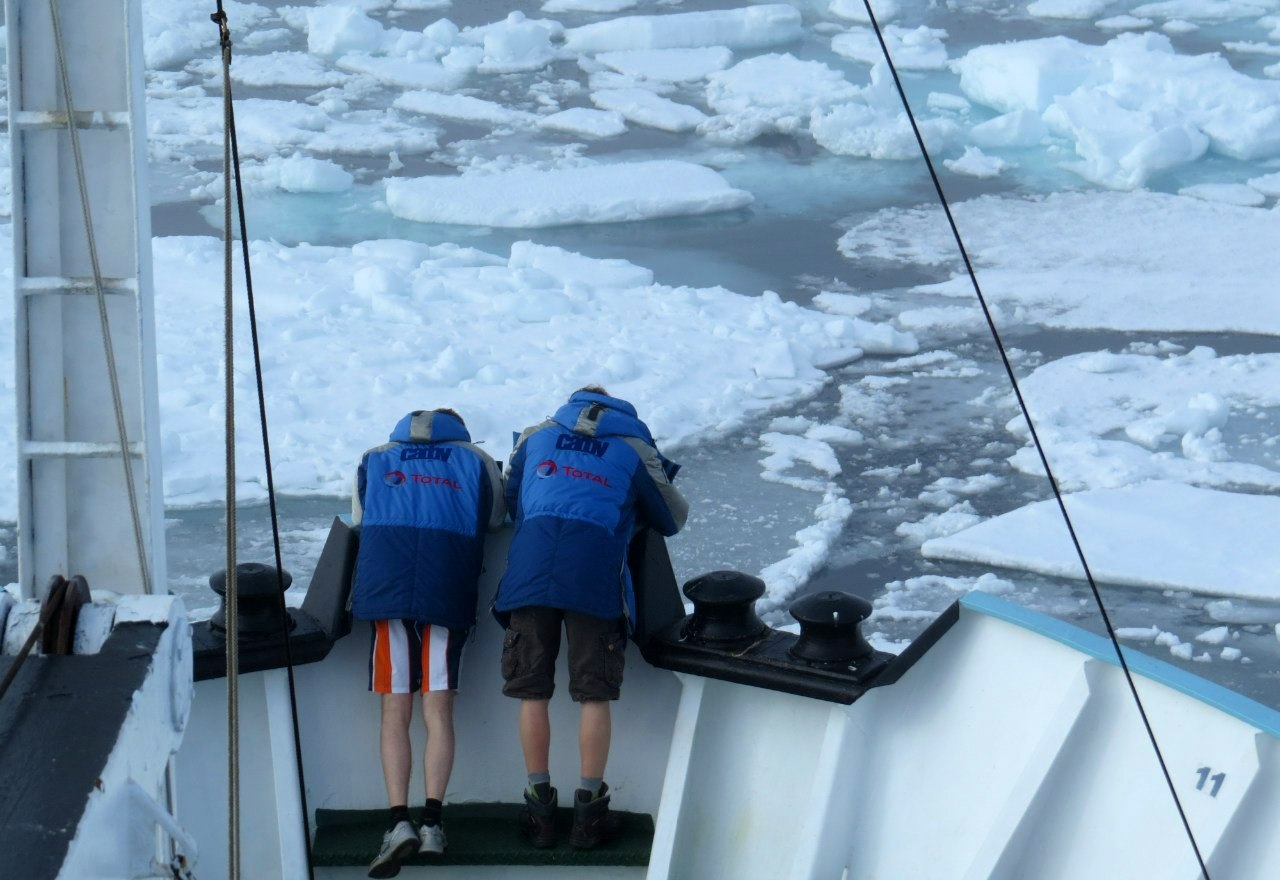
Onboard Professor Molchanov in the Kara Sea during the Arctic expedition "Arctic Floating University 2013"

Since 2012, annual expeditions have been conducted on board the ship within the framework of the Northern (Arctic) Federal University Floating University project.

=== Passenger ship ===
The ship was converted for passenger use, and is now operated by Oceanwide Expeditions for expedition cruising in high latitudes. She has one suite, 23 twin cabins and 2 triple cabins. The public areas consist of a lounge and bar, small library, infirmary, and sauna. The dining room also serves as a lecture room. There are viewing areas on the open deck and passengers are usually welcome on the bridge. She has Zodiac craft for landings and wildlife viewing.

=== Arrest ===
On 31 August 2026, the ship was seized in Barentsburg, Svalbard, following an order from the Norwegian Nord-Troms and Senja District Court at the request of the Ukrainian state-owned company Naftogaz. The seizure was part of enforcement of a 2023 arbitral award ordering Russia to pay Naftogaz US$4.22 billion, plus interest and legal costs, for Russia's 2014 seizure of its assets in Crimea. The vessel was prohibited from leaving Barentsburg.
