= Vartiovene 55 =

Former Finnish Navy R-class patrol boat

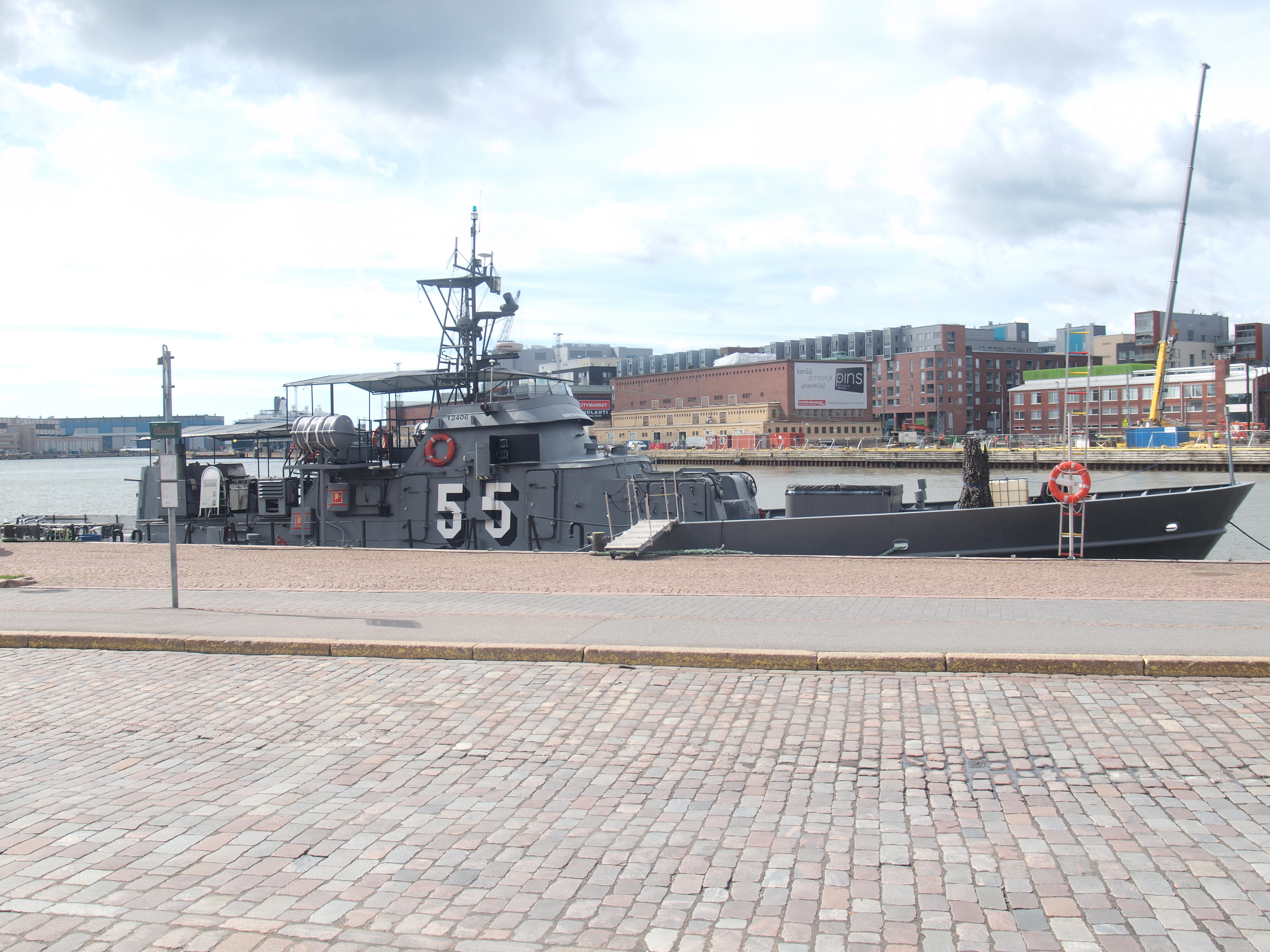
- Vartiovene 55 in Helsinki

History
- Name: Vartiovene 55
- Owner: Wave and Soul Cruises
- Builder: Turku harbour
- Launched: 2 July 1959
- Commissioned: 29 October 1959
- Homeport: Helsinki
- Status: Laid up

General characteristics
- Type: Commercial cruise ship (previously minesweeper)
- Length: 36.0 m (118 ft)
- Draught: 2.0 m (7 ft)
- Installed power: 2 × V12; 1,350 hp (1,010 kW)
- Speed: 20 knots (37 km/h; 23 mph)
- Sensors & processing systems: British 163A sonar sensors; Soviet MG-11 sonar sensors
- Armament: none; (formerly: 1 × Bofors 40 mm/70; 1 × Madsen 20 mm gun; 1 × Squid depth charge launcher; 2 × Sergei 23 mm twin-barrelled anti-aircraft guns)

Vartiovene 55 is a former Finnish Navy R-class patrol boat bought into private ownership and converted into a commercial cruise ship. It can be rented for private pleasure trips on the Baltic Sea.

== History ==
Originally named Röyttä, the ship was built as a minesweeper in the Turku harbour on 2 July 1959. It was originally numbered 5, but the number was changed to 55 in the middle 1970s. Röyttä and its sister ships, Ruissalo, Raisio, Rihtniemi and Rymättylä, were originally designed to serve as coastal minesweepers, based at Pansio.

In June 1969, a new patrol fleet was founded and Röyttä and Raisio moved to Upinniemi. Röyttä underwent a redesign in 1980. Röyttä and its sister ships served the Finnish Navy until the end of the 1990s. Since then, Rihtniemi and Rymättylä were transferred to the Estonian Navy, Ruissalo was scrapped and Raisio was sold completely stripped of its armament and equipment.

== Current situation ==
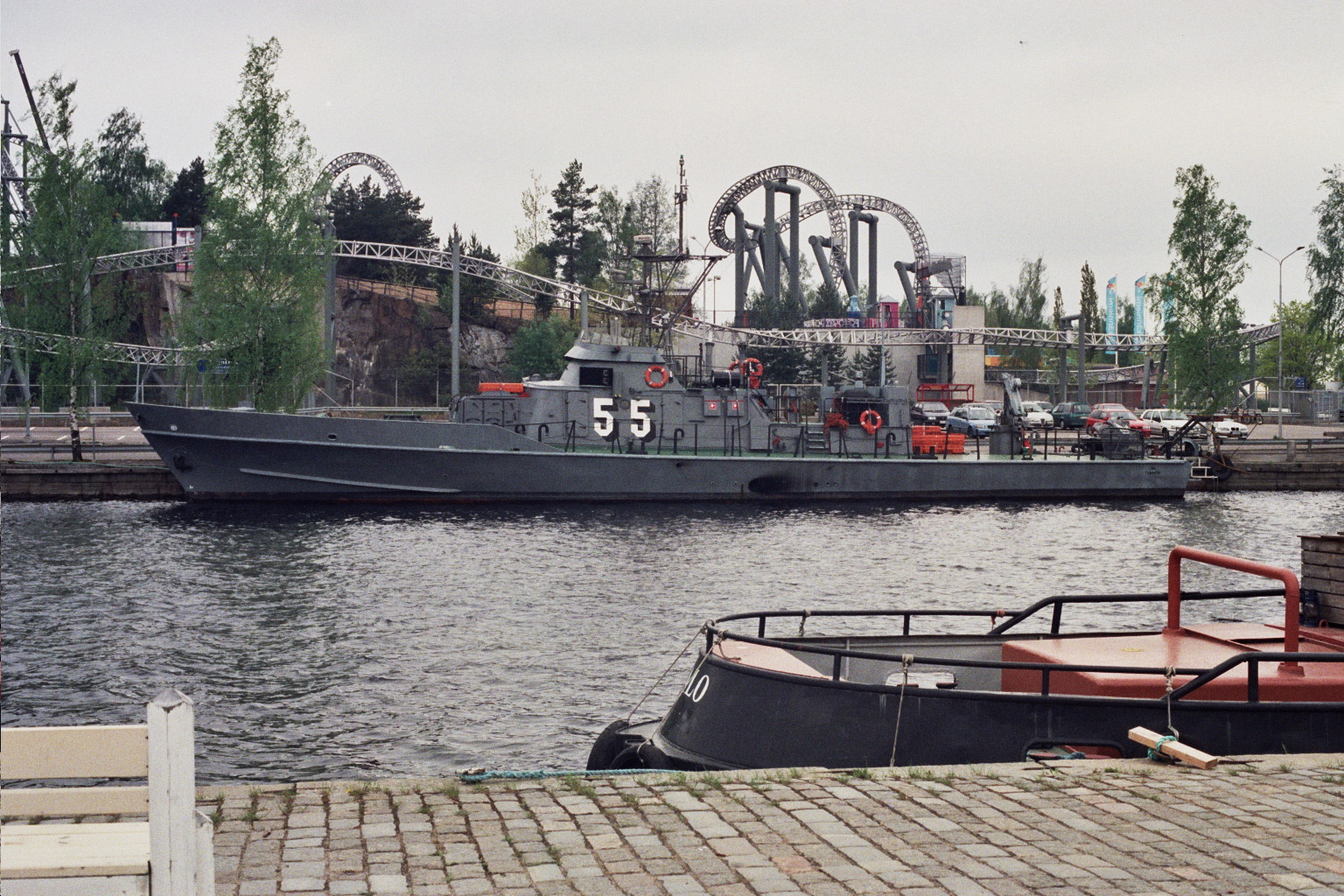
Vartiovene 55 in Tampere, prior to its transfer to Helsinki.

The Finnish Navy resigned ownership of the ship in 1999, and since 2006 it has been in private ownership, stripped of its armament. Since 2012, it has been in commercial use in Helsinki. The ship is owned by the company Wave and Soul Cruises, which rents the ship for private trips and maintains the ship's condition.

== Facilities ==
The ship holds a maximum of 61 passengers. It has two conference rooms and a sauna in its interior, and a jacuzzi on its top deck.
