= Pansio shipyard =

Shipyard in Turku, Finland

Pansio shipyard (Finnish: Pansion telakka, Swedish: Pansiovarvet) was a shipyard in Pansio, Turku where ships have been built between 1945 and 1987.

The shipyard was originally established in the 1930s as a repair and maintenance yard for the nearby Pansio naval base. In 1946, it became part of Valtion Metallitehtaat, which then soon changed its name to Valmet. Since 1951, it was called Valmet Oy Pansio shipyard. Until 1952, the shipyard focused on serving the needs of the war reparations industry, and 58 barges and river tugs for the Soviet Union were manufactured there. It had 750 employees in the early 1950s.

In 1945, also a neighbouring shipyard Oy Laivateollisuus Ab was established in Pansio, whose purpose was to build 46 wooden schooners for Finland's war reparations to the Soviet Union until 1952 with Zarya being the last vessel. In 1973, Laivateollisuus was acquired by Valmet, and the two adjacent shipyards were merged in 1983.

In 1986, all shipyards of Valmet and Wärtsilä were merged into a new company Wärtsilä Marine. The Pansio shipyard was closed shortly after the merger in 1987, and some of its operations were transferred to Wärtsilä's Perno shipyard in Turku.
