= Akademik Shokalskiy =

Ice-strengthened ship built in Finland in 1982

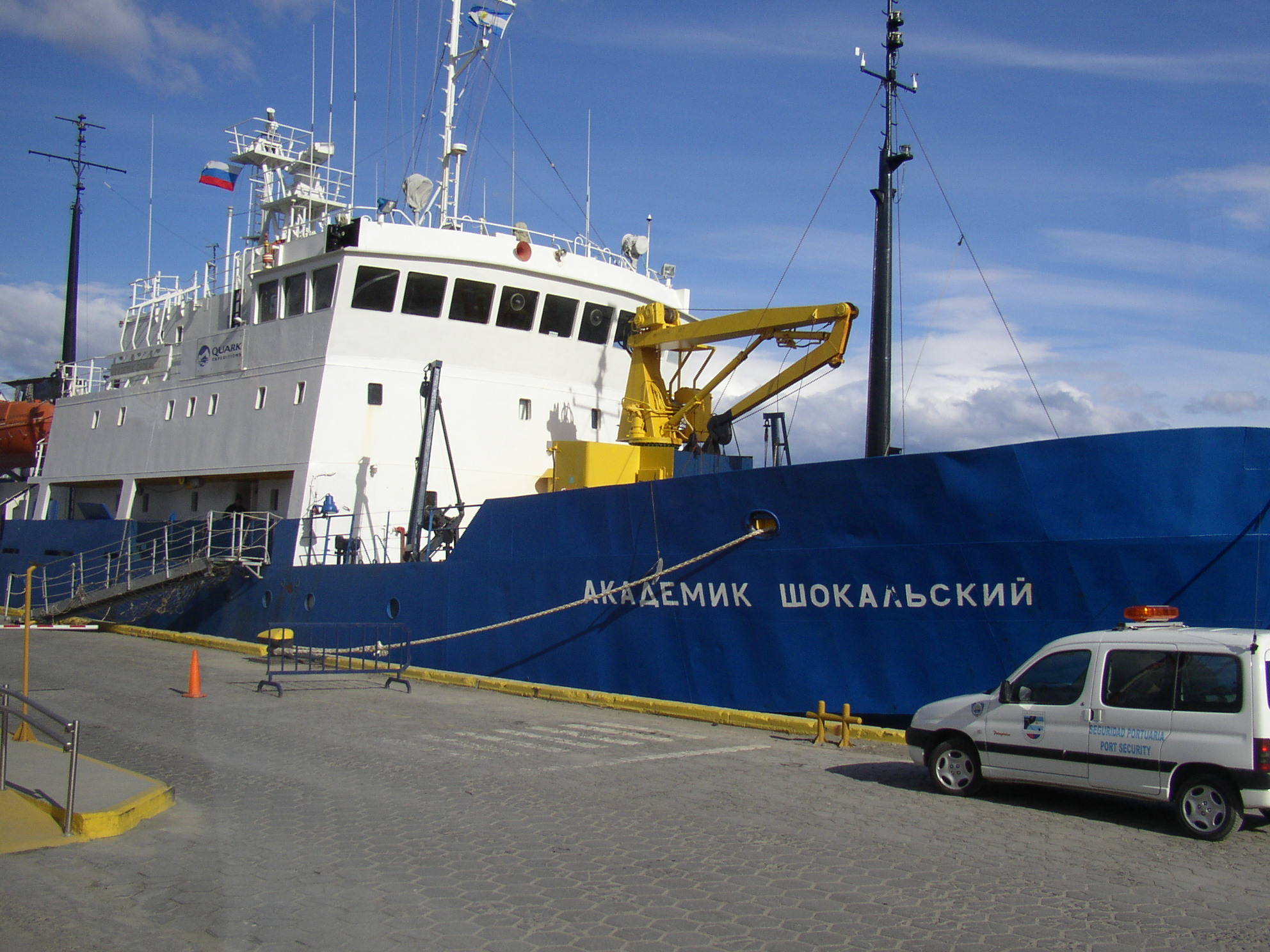
- Akademik Shokalskiy moored in Ushuaia

History

Russia
- Name: Akademik Shokalskiy
- Owner: Russian Federation
- Operator: 2011-2012: Aurora Expeditions, Sydney, Australia; 2013-2014: Australasian Antarctic Expedition
- Port of registry: 1982–1992: Vladivostok; 1992–2013: Vladivostok
- Builder: Oy Laivateollisuus Ab, Turku, Finland
- Yard number: 343
- Laid down: 2 November 1981
- Launched: 10 March 1982
- Identification: Call sign: UBNF; IMO number: 8010336; MMSI number: 273458210
- Status: In service

General characteristics
- Class & type: Akademik Shuleykin-class research vessel, now Polar Pioneer-class cruise ship
- Tonnage: 1,764 GT; 529 NT; 620 DWT
- Displacement: 2,140 tonnes
- Length: 71.06 m (233 ft 2 in)
- Beam: 12.82 m (42 ft 1 in)
- Draught: 4.50 m (14 ft 9 in)
- Ice class: RMRS UL
- Installed power: Two 6ChRN 36/45 diesel engines (2 × 1,147 kW)
- Propulsion: Single shaft; controllable-pitch propeller
- Speed: 14 knots (26 km/h; 16 mph)
- Capacity: 50
- Crew: 30

MV Akademik Shokalskiy (Russian: Академик Шокальский) is a Russian Akademik Shuleykin-class ice-strengthened ship, built in Finland in 1982 and originally used for oceanographic research. In 1998 she was fully refurbished to serve as a research ship for Arctic and Antarctic work. For two weeks from 25 December 2013 Akademik Shokalskiy was trapped in thick ice in Commonwealth Bay, Antarctica, while operating an expedition for the Australasian Antarctic Expedition 2013–2014. The scientists and passengers were evacuated on 2 January. The ship has more recently been used as a cruise ship for expeditions.

== History ==
=== Construction ===
Akademik Shokalskiy is an Akademik Shuleykin-class ice-strengthened ship. She was built by the shipbuilder Oy Laivateollisuus Ab in Turku. Her keel was laid down on 2 November 1981, and she was launched on 10 March 1982.

She is named after the Russian oceanographer Yuly Shokalsky.

She was originally used for oceanographic research.

=== Icebound in Antarctica ===
In 2013 Akademik Shokalskiy was chartered by the Australasian Antarctic Expedition 2013–2014 to celebrate the centenary of the previous expedition under Douglas Mawson, and to repeat his scientific observations. The expedition had nine scientific goals related to observations, mapping, and measurements of environmental, biological, and marine changes associated with climate change. On 8 December 2013 the ship, with 74 people on board — four journalists, 19 scientists, 26 tourists, the expedition leader's wife and two children, and 22 crew members — sailed from Bluff in New Zealand to Antarctica. Around 07:20 AEDT on 25 December 2013, the ship broadcast a distress message after becoming trapped in heavy ice a few miles from the coast of Antarctica, 100 nautical miles (190 km; 120 mi) east of the French base Dumont D'Urville and approximately 1,500 nautical miles (2,800 km; 1,700 mi) south of Hobart. Chinese icebreaking research vessel Xue Long, French research vessel L'Astrolabe and Australian icebreaker Aurora Australis were dispatched by the Australian Maritime Safety Authority to assist with the rescue operation of Akademik Shokalskiy.

Xuě Lóng, which arrived first, was prevented by thick sea ice from coming closer than about 6 nautical miles (11 km; 6.9 mi) from Akademik Shokalskiy. However it remained in open water nearby as it carried a helicopter, which ultimately was deployed later for the rescue operation. L'Astrolabe also turned back after encountering heavy ice. Aurora Australis, arriving two days later, abandoned its attempt about 10 nautical miles (19 km; 12 mi) from the stranded ship, as the ice was too thick to be broken and because of the risk of also becoming trapped in the ice.

On 2 January 2014, Akademik Shokalskiy's 52 passengers were evacuated to Aurora Australis by Xuě Lóng's helicopter, which transferred them between temporary ice helipads alongside each vessel. The original plan was to helicopter the passengers to Xuě Lóng, then transfer them to Aurora Australis by boat, but the Chinese icebreaker had become trapped by ice. After the rescue, Aurora Australis continued on her original mission to resupply Casey Station, before returning to Hobart on 22 January. The 22 Akademik Shokalskiy crew were required by their employment contracts to stay aboard until the ship could be freed.

On 4 January 2014, the American heavy icebreaker Polar Star was dispatched from Sydney, Australia to assist Akademik Shokalskiy and Xuě Lóng at the request of Australian authorities. However, on 8 January the Australian Maritime Safety Authority confirmed that both vessels had broken free and were proceeding to open water, and later the same day Polar Star was released to scheduled duties. On 14 January Akademik Shokalskiy returned to the port of Bluff.

Environmental writer Andrew Revkin criticised the scientists on board Akademik Shokalskiy, stating that "important and costly field research in Antarctica has been seriously disrupted" by an "unessential" mission. He also commended an article by Professor Michael Robinson of University of Hartford, which noted that the expedition aimed to use Mawson's observations as a baseline for their own scientific findings "that will illuminate Antarctica's future, not its past. As such, the voyage will prove to be well worth the time and effort."

=== Use as cruise ship ===
Akademik Shokalskiy operated as a cruise ship for some time. From 2011 until 2012, she was operated by the Australian company Aurora Expeditions, based in Sydney

She accommodates up to 50 passengers in double and twin cabins with private facilities. Its Russian crew was accompanied by experienced naturalists and guides, whose focus was "getting you ashore as often as possible for as long as possible with maximum safety and comfort". The food was prepared by New Zealand and Australian chefs. However, as of 2025 it appears to no longer operate as a cruise ship.

== Description ==
Akademik Shokalskiy is an Akademik Shuleykin-class ice-strengthened ship.

She is the sister ship of Spirit of Enderby (Professor Khromov), built in 1983.

As of 2025 she is owned by the Russian Federation and registered in Vladivostok.
