= Aleksandr Yudovich =

Soviet sea captain and maritime safety expert

- Александр Юдович
- Born: 3 December 1930; Moscow, Russian SFSR, Soviet Union
- Died: 30 March 1998 (aged 67); Russia
- Occupations: Scientist, sea captain
- Known for: Founding contributions to maritime safety science
- Notable work: Under Sail in the 20th Century: The Voyage of the Schooner Zarya (1960), Collisions of Sea Vessels: Their Causes and Prevention (1972), Prevention of Navigational Accidents of Sea Vessels (1982)

Aleksandr Borisovich Yudovich (Russian: Александр Борисович Юдович; 3 December 1930 – 30 March 1998) was a Soviet Candidate of Technical Sciences (roughly equivalent to a PhD) and a specialist in geophysics and maritime safety, researcher and long-distance sea captain. He is best known as the commander of the unique non-magnetic research schooner Zarya during the round-the-world expeditions of 1957–1958 (the International Geophysical Year) and 1960–1961, as well as the author of fundamental works on the prevention of navigational accidents at sea.

== Early life and education ==
Yudovich was born into the family of a prominent economic manager. His father, Boris Abramovich Yudovich, headed the oil machinery trust Azneftemash in Baku and was a member of the Central Committee of the Communist Party of Azerbaijan, but in 1937 he was repressed and executed as a “saboteur”. His mother, Lidiya Vladimirovna Dombrovskaya, was arrested in 1938 as a family member of an “enemy of the people” and sent to the Akmolinsk Camp of Wives of Traitors to the Motherland. Only after Stalin's death, in 1955, was she released.

Young Aleksandr and his older brother avoided being sent to an orphanage — they were taken in and raised by relatives (first on their mother's side, then their father's), despite the great personal risk this entailed.

From an early age, he dreamed of the sea. As a teenager, he entered the Baku Maritime College, and after graduation he advanced from sailor to ship captain in just two years (1951–1953). He later obtained higher education by graduating from the Leningrad Higher Engineering Maritime School. The knowledge and experience he gained in navigation and marine engineering enabled him to begin work with the oceanographic research expeditions of the USSR Academy of Sciences in the 1950s.

The abilities of the young seaman were quickly noticed, and in 1957, after all charges against his father had been dropped and his family fully rehabilitated, Aleksandr Yudovich was appointed captain of a special expedition vessel — the non-magnetic sailing and motor schooner Zarya.

== Expeditions on the schooner Zarya ==
In 1957, as part of the International Geophysical Year, the Institute of Terrestrial Magnetism of the USSR Academy of Sciences organized a round-the-world expedition aboard the Zarya to conduct magnetic surveys of the oceans. The scientific director of the expedition was geophysicist M. M. Ivanov, and the ship's captain was A. B. Yudovich.

After extensive preparation and testing, on August 3, 1957, Zarya under Yudovich's command departed from Leningrad and set sail for the Atlantic Ocean. Over fifteen months of continuous navigation, the vessel covered a distance equivalent to nearly two circumnavigations of the equator, crossing the Atlantic and Indian Oceans several times and visiting dozens of ports around the world — from North and South America to Africa, Australia, and Indonesia.

The expedition carried out measurements of the Earth's magnetic field, ionospheric research, and cosmic ray monitoring in previously inaccessible regions of the world's oceans. The circumnavigation ended on November 4, 1958, when Zarya returned home, entering the port of Odessa.

The voyage drew the attention of the international scientific community: in many foreign ports, local scientists came aboard Zarya to learn about its unique instruments and the first research results. The ship and its crew gained wide recognition.

Yudovich shared his impressions and a detailed chronicle of the voyage in his book Under Sail in the 20th Century: The Voyage of the Schooner Zarya, published in 1960 by Geografgiz Publishing House. Written in the style of a captain's travel diary, the book vividly depicts the everyday life of the crew and scientific team aboard the small sailing vessel. It was later translated into several foreign languages.

Subsequently, Yudovich led another Zarya expedition (1960–1961).

== Scientific work ==
After completing his career as a sea captain and later taking a position at the Ministry of the Merchant Marine, Yudovich turned his attention to the problems of maritime accidents and the prevention of ship collisions. He was among the first in the USSR to begin a systematic analysis of the causes of maritime accidents based on extensive statistical data.

In 1970, he defended his dissertation for the degree of Candidate of Technical Sciences on the topic of ship collision prevention. Building on this work, he published a series of monographs and manuals for seafarers. The first of these was Collisions of Sea Vessels: Their Causes and Prevention (Moscow: Transport, 1972). This work summarized analyses of ship collisions from the 1960s. The book was intended for a wide range of professionals—from cadets to captains—and became a standard reference for many sailors of that time.

The monograph was soon translated abroad into Bulgarian (1972) and, according to some sources, into other European languages as well. Yudovich's proposals were also put into practice: his analysis of typical navigator errors became the basis for training programs for navigation officers of the Soviet fleet, and some of his recommendations were incorporated when adapting the 1972 International Regulations for Preventing Collisions at Sea (COLREGs-72) to Soviet conditions.

Continuing his research, Yudovich prepared an expanded work summarizing data accumulated over two more decades. In 1982, the first edition of his book Prevention of Navigational Accidents of Sea Vessels was published, with a second, revised edition released in 1988. In this study, he analyzed more than 1,000 maritime incidents involving vessels of over 500 gross tons and identified patterns of accident occurrence — correlations between the severity of consequences and external conditions (fog, storm, navigation area, time of day) as well as technical factors related to the vessel's condition.

For each typical cause, specific real-world examples of accidents were provided, accompanied by detailed recommendations for preventing similar situations. Yudovich emphasized in particular that the human factor remained the principal cause of most disasters and that organizational measures were necessary to minimize navigator errors.

The 1988 book became a comprehensive practical guide on maritime safety, recommended for captains and navigation officers of the merchant and fishing fleets, and was translated into German. Thanks to this and his earlier works, Yudovich helped lay the scientific foundation for the Soviet system of maritime safety management.

As a recognized expert in this field, he served for several years as an arbitrator of the Maritime Arbitration Commission in cases involving ship collisions. He also worked for some time as Deputy Head of the Main Maritime Inspectorate of the Ministry of the Merchant Marine.

== Personal life ==
While studying at the maritime college, Yudovich met Galina Danilovna Osipova (born 1930), who became his wife in 1951. The couple had two children: a son, Sergey (born 1953), and a daughter, Olga (born 1962). He later had two grandchildren: Yulia Sergeyevna Fedorishina (Yudovich) (born June 15, 1978) and Oleg Alekseyevich Adamovich (born December 19, 1986).

He died on March 30, 1998, after a long illness.

== Bibliography ==
- Yudovich, A. B. Under Sail in the 20th Century. The Voyage of the Schooner Zarya. Moscow: Geografgiz, 1960. 176 p.
- Yudovich, A. B. Collisions of Sea Vessels, Their Causes and Prevention. Moscow: Transport, 1972. 112 p.
- Yudovich, A. B. Prevention of Navigational Accidents of Sea Vessels. 2nd ed., revised and expanded. Moscow: Transport, 1988. 224 p.
