= Pavel Molchanov =

Russian scientist (1893–1941)

- Павел Молчанов
- Born: 18 February 1893; Volosovo, Russian Empire
- Died: October 1941; Leningrad, Russian SFSR, USSR
- Occupation: meteorologist

Pavel Alexandrovich Molchanov (Russian: Павел Александрович Молчанов) (18 February [O.S. 6 February] 1893 – October 1941) was a Soviet Russian meteorologist and the inventor of the first Russian radiosonde in 1930, while the French Pierre Idrac (1885-1935) and Robert Bureau (1892-1965) were the first to develop the radiosonde in 1929.

== Biography ==
Molchanov graduated from Petersburg University in 1914, worked in the Main Physical (Geophysical) Observatory in Pavlovsk between 1917 and 1939 and then at the institute of civil air fleet in Leningrad. He studied possibilities of applying aerological data to the weather forecast.

Molchanov constructed meteorographs, carried by sondes and aircraft and improved pilot observation technique. A radiosonde of his design was first launched on January 30, 1930. Named "271120", it was released 13:44 Moscow Time in Pavlovsk, USSR from the Main Geophysical Observatory and reached a height of 7.8 kilometers measuring temperature there (-40.7 °C). Thirty-two (32) minutes after the launch, the radiosonde sent one of the first aerological message to the Leningrad Weather Bureau and Moscow Central Forecast Institute, only one year after the French's experiment.

In July 1931, conducting programme of the International Polar Year, German scientists invited him to take part in an expedition into the Arctic onboard LZ 127 Graf Zeppelin and launch his radiosondes in polar latitudes. Twelve sondes were prepared for that purpose at Pavlovsk Observatory under Molchanov's leadership and successfully launched, conducting the first aerological observations in the Arctic. Molchanov also participated in first Soviet stratospheric balloon ascents (1933–34).

Since 1935 serial production of radiosondes was started in Leningrad. Molchanov's radiosonde construction was so perfect technically, that it was used until 1958 without any significant changes, providing sufficient accuracy of measurements, regularity and stability.

In August 1941, Molchanov was arrested by Stalin's secret police. During transport on a prison barge on Lake Ladoga, Molchanov was shot. Allegedly this occurred when he attempted to climb a ladder to get fresh air.

Soviet Oceanographic Ice-Class Research Vessel Professor Molchanov, operated since 1983, was named in his honor.
