= Zarya (non-magnetic ship) =

Sailing-motor schooner

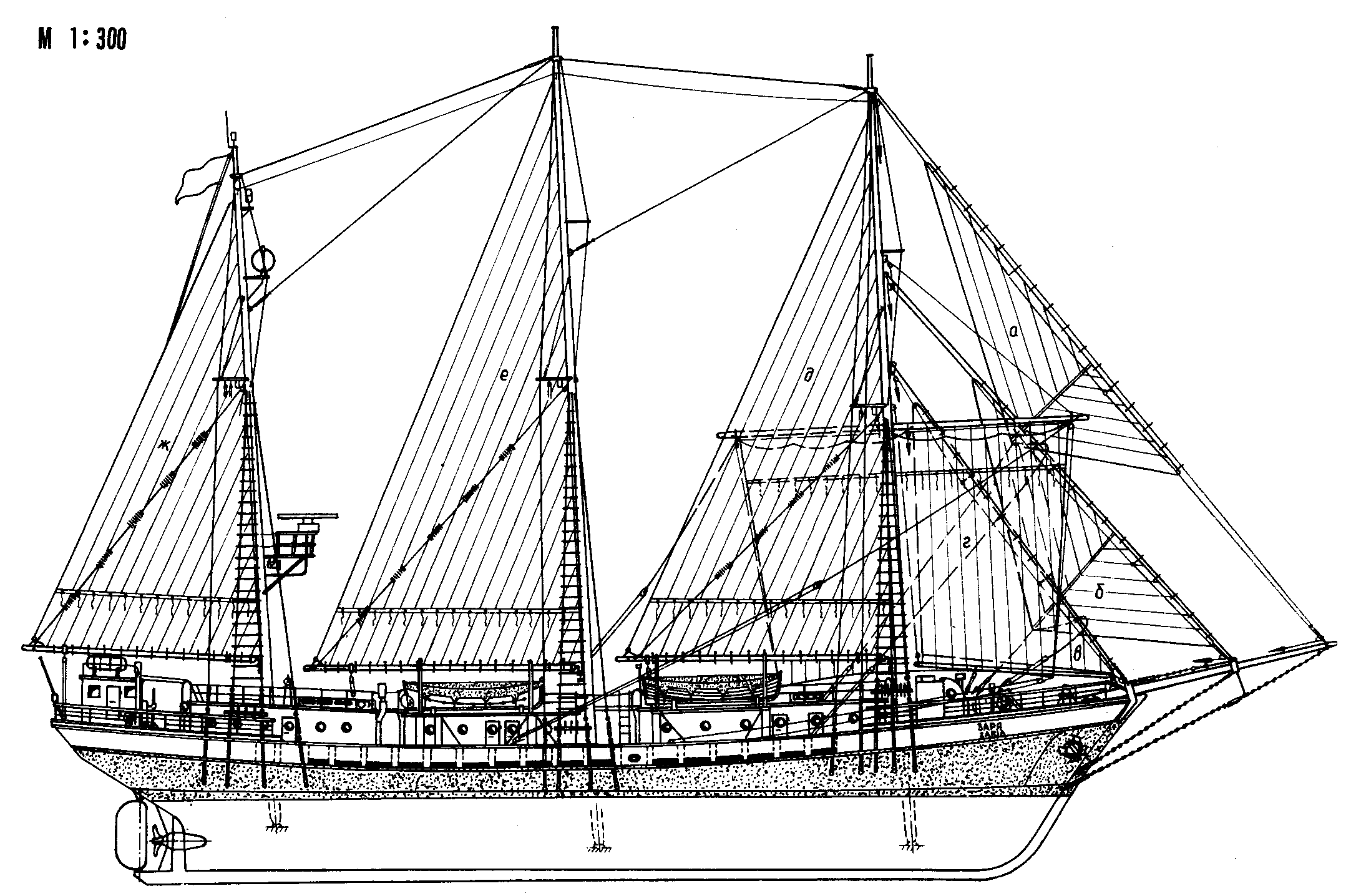

History
- Name: Zarya
- Operator: USSR Academy of Sciences; Russian Academy of Sciences (from 1991)
- Builder: Oy Laivateollisuus Ab, Turku, Finland
- Launched: 1952
- Home port: Murmansk
- Status: Unknown

General characteristics
- Type: Three-masted gaff-rigged schooner
- Displacement: 600 long tons (610 t) full load
- Length: 52.56 m (172 ft 5 in)
- Beam: 8.97 m (29 ft 5 in)
- Draught: 3.38 m (11 ft 1 in)
- Propulsion: 1 × 300 bhp (224 kW) R6D136 diesel engine, 1 shaft
- Speed: 8 knots (15 km/h; 9.2 mph)
- Crew: 35 + 10 mission crew

Zarya (Russian: Заря, The Sunrise) was a sailing-motor schooner built in 1952, and since 1953 used by the USSR Academy of Sciences to study Earth's magnetic field.

After the Continuation War Finland was ordered by the USSR to provide 50 wooden sailing-motor fishing schooners as reparations. One of them was taken, and in 1952 modified, into a low magnetic research vessel named Zarya for the Pushkov Institute of Terrestrial Magnetism, Ionosphere and Radiowave Propagation (IZMIRAN). From 1953 the ship was used to measure the magnetic field of the Earth. In 1957, as part of the International Geophysical Year, the Institute of Terrestrial Magnetism of the USSR Academy of Sciences organized a round-the-world expedition aboard the Zarya to conduct magnetic surveys of the oceans. The scientific director of the expedition was geophysicist M. Ivanov, and the ship's captain was A. Yudovich.

In 1991 IZMIRAN was transferred to the Russian Academy of Sciences.

In 1976 a rupes on planet Mercury was named after the ship, the "Zarya Rupes".

== See also ==
- Carnegie (yacht), another ship for which a rupes on Mercury is named
