= Northern (Arctic) Federal University =

Russian university

Northern (Arctic) Federal University, named after M. V. Lomonosov
- Северный (Арктический) федеральный университет имени М. В. Ломоносова
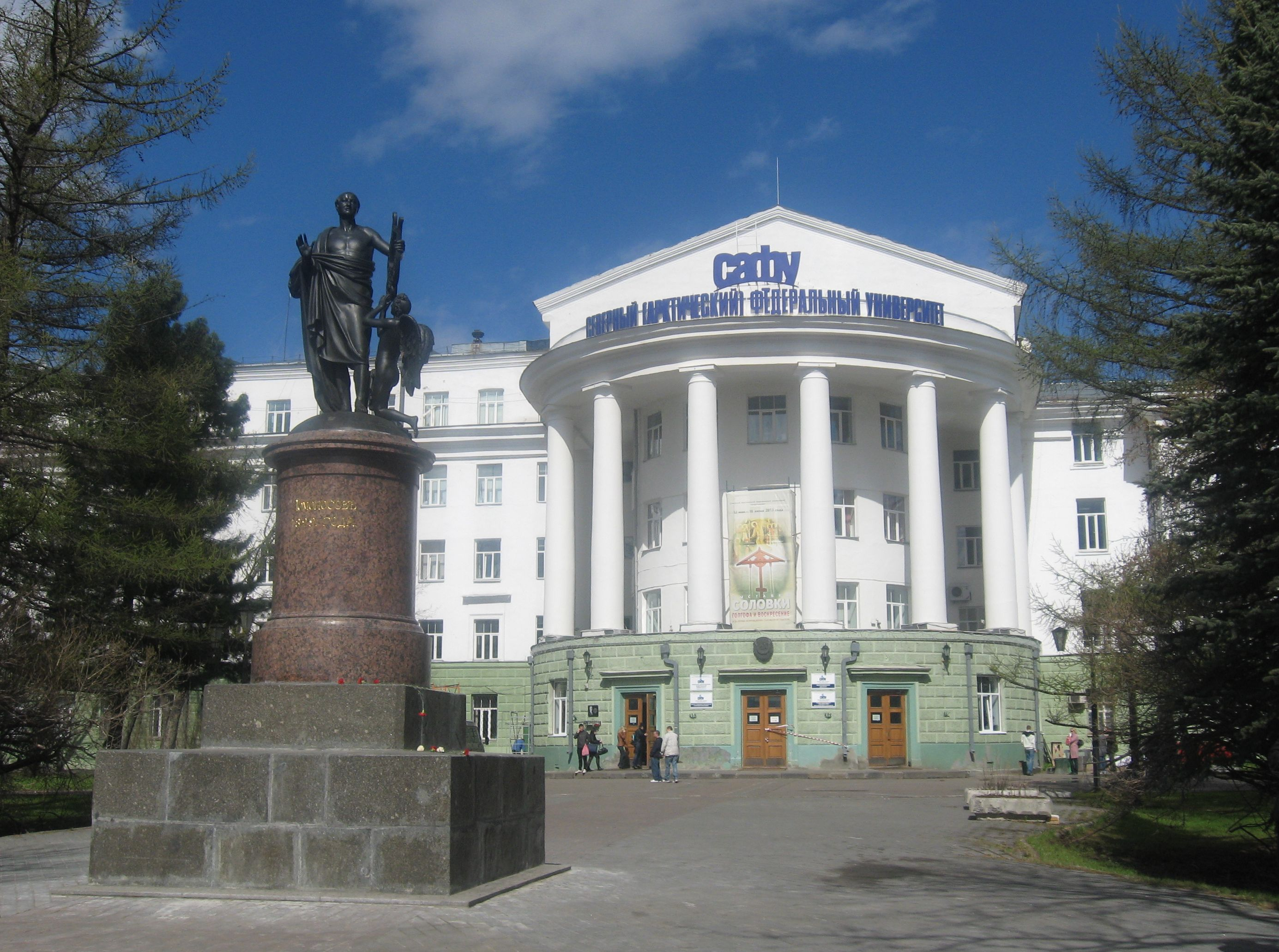
- Main building
- Former names: Archangelsk State Technical University; Pomorsky State University
- Type: Federal university
- Established: 2010
- Rector: Mikhail Viktorovich Danilov (a/d)
- Students: 18000
- Postgraduates: > 400
- Location: Arkhangelsk, Arkhangelsk Oblast, Russia; 64°31′44″N 40°32′57″E
- Colours: Pantone 282, White, Pantone Process Cyan
- Website: narfu.ru

University rankings

Regional – Overall
- QS Emerging Europe and Central Asia: 251-300 (2022)

Northern (Arctic) Federal University named after M.V. Lomonosov (Russian: Северный (Арктический) Федеральный университет имени М. В. Ломоносова), or NArFU for short, is a Federal University established in Arkhangelsk pursuant to Russian Federation President Dmitry Medvedev’s decree dated 8 June 2010 on the basis of Arkhangelsk State Technical University (ASTU) .

== History of establishment ==
NArFU was set up on the basis of Arkhangelsk State Technical University (ASTU) by decree of the President of the Russian Federation Dmitry Medvedev. The rector of the university is Elena V. Kudryashova, professor, PhD. On 12 July 2011, the university was restructured through merger with state-owned high and vocational schools – M.V. Lomonosov Pomor State University, Emperor Peter I Forestry Engineering College in Arkhangelsk, Severodvinsk Technical College – and renamed into M.V. Lomonosov Northern (Arctic) Federal University. The university bears the name of the 18th century polymath Mikhail Lomonosov, born in the Arkhangelsk region.

== Organization ==
NArFU incorporates 7 Higher schools and 2 campuses based in Severodvinsk and Koryazhma

- Higher School of Social Sciences, Humanities and International Communication
- Higher School of Natural Sciences and Technologies
- Higher School of Information Technologies and Automated Systems
- Higher School of Economics, Management and Law
- Higher School of Engineering
- Higher School of Power Engineering, Oil and Gas

The Higher School of Energy, Oil and Gas prepares undergraduate and graduate students for careers in the Russian energy sector. Its curriculum combines academic coursework with practical training supported by specialized laboratory and research facilities.

- Нigher School of Psychology, Pedagogy and Physical Education

Higher School of Psychology and Pedagogical Education was established in 2016 on the basis of two institutes: Institute of Pedagogy and Psychology and Institute of Physical Education, Sport and Health. Both institutes were successors of Pomor State University, its departments and faculties: Department of Pedagogy, Faculty of Special Education, Faculty of Pedagogy of Primary Education and Social Pedagogy, Faculty of Psychology, Faculty of Physical Education.

- Institute of Shipbuilding and Maritime Arctic Engineering (former Sevmashvtuz (Sevmash Technical College))
- Institute of Humanities (branch in Severodvinsk)
- Technical College (branch in Severodvinsk)
- Koryazhma Branch
- Technological College of Emperor Peter I

== Colleges ==
- The University Colleges include College of Telecommunications and Information Technologies
- Severodvinsk Technical College
- Emperor Peter I Forestry Engineering College in Arkhangelsk.
- Higher School of Fishery and Marine Technologies

== Branches and other institutions ==
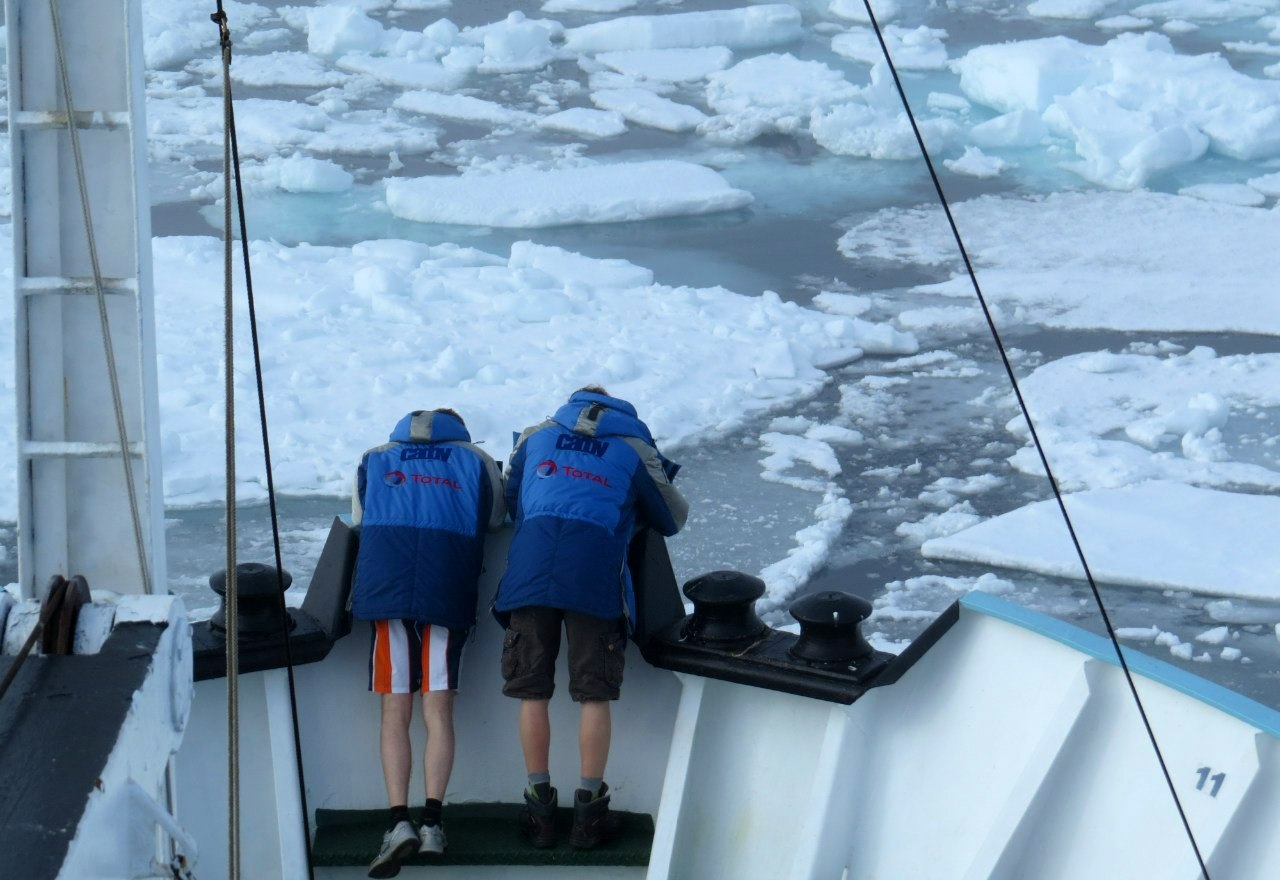
On board Professor Molchanov in the Kara Sea during the Arctic expedition "Arctic Floating University 2013"

NArFU branches are located in Severodvinsk and Koryazhma. Two more are to be opened in Kotlas and Nenets Autonomous District.

The Arctic Floating University is an programme produced by NArFU, Roshydromet and the Arkhangelsk branch of the Russian Geographical Society. It has been held annually since 2012.

== Sport ==
The university has signed a cooperation agreement with Russian Bandy Federation.
