= Stockholm-class patrol boat =

Swedish class of corvettes

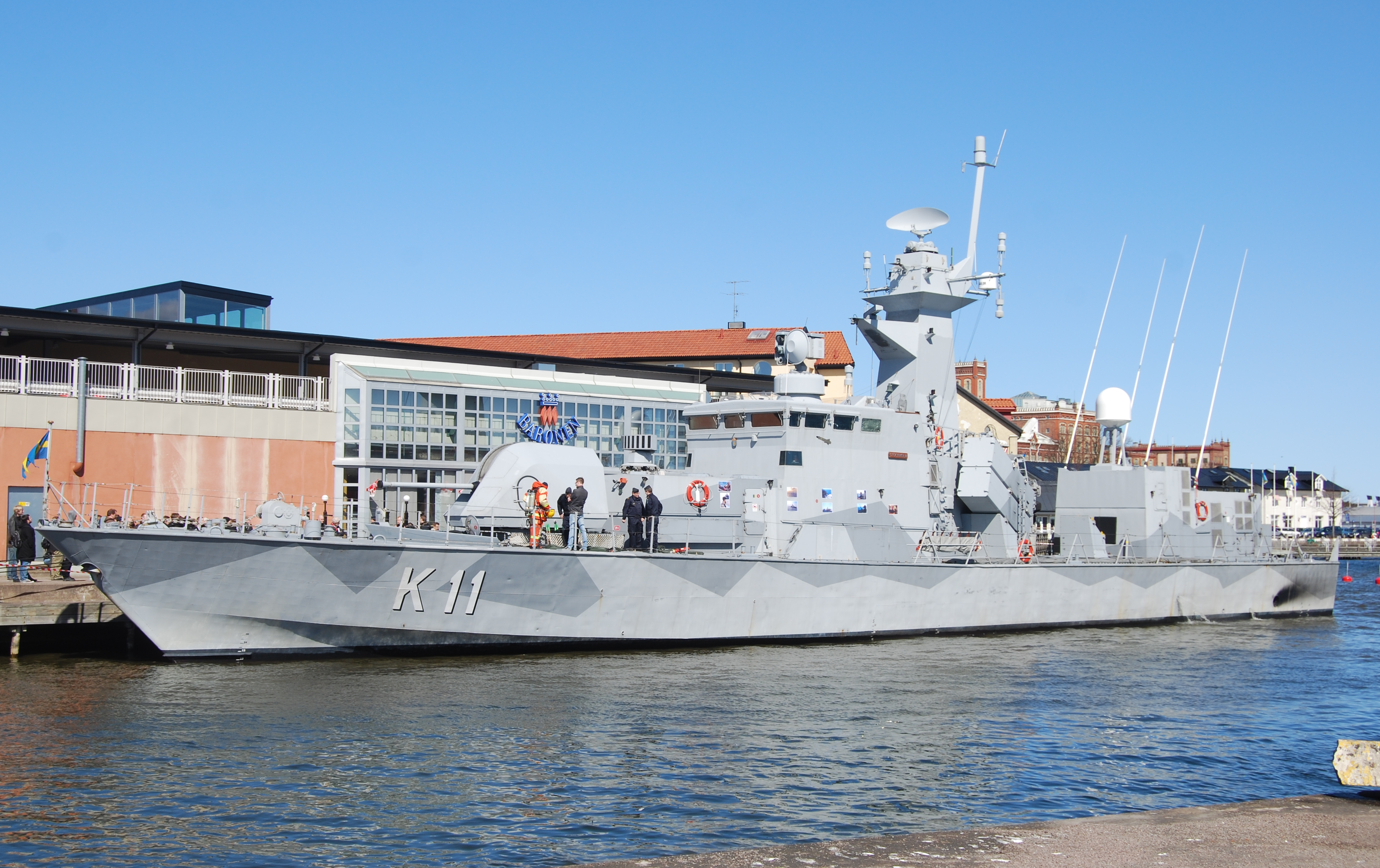
- HSwMS Stockholm in Kalmar

Class overview
- Builders: Karlskronavarvet AB
- Operators: Swedish Navy
- Succeeded by: Göteborg class
- In commission: 22 August 1984
- Planned: 2
- Completed: 2
- Active: 2

General characteristics
- Type: Corvette
- Displacement: 380 t (370 long tons)
- Length: 50 m (164 ft 1 in)
- Beam: 7.5 m (24 ft 7 in)
- Draught: 2.6 m (8 ft 6 in)
- Propulsion: As built; 2 × MTU 16V396 TB93 diesel engines at 2,095 shp (1,562 kW) each; 1 × Allison 570-KF at 7,170 shp (5,350 kW); After 2000 refit; 2 × MTU 16V396 TB94 diesel engines at 2,640 shp (1,970 kW) each; 1 × Vericor TF50 at 5,440 shp (4,060 kW)
- Speed: 30 knots (56 km/h; 35 mph)
- Complement: 40
- Sensors & processing systems: Sea Giraffe 50HC air/surface search; 9LV 300 missile control; SS304 Spira HMS; TSM 2642 MF VDS
- Electronic warfare & decoys: Rheinmetall TKWA/MASS (Multi Ammunition Softkill System)
- Armament: When launched; 1 × Bofors 57 mm gun; 1 × Bofors 40 mm gun; 2 x 533 mm Torpedo 613; 8 × RBS15 Mk2 AShM; Current; 1 × Bofors 57 mm MKII gun; 4-8 × RBS15 Mk2 AShM; 40 cm Torpedo 45; Mines & depth charges

The Stockholm class is a pair of warships of the Swedish Navy. Built as corvettes in Karlskrona 1984–1985, they are armed with four RBS15 anti-ship missiles, one 57 mm cannon and several machine guns. In 2017 the two units in the class were rebuilt and are now serving as patrol boats. The option to carry anti-ship missiles does however remain.

== History ==
The Stockholm class started as a study for a ship with increased endurance, a project called Ytattack-81 (Surface combatant-81), which was built on the torpedo boats of the Spica and Spica II classes, but with an increased displacement from 230 to 350 tonnes (230 to 340 long tons). The engine was to be a CODAG-concept, two diesels and one gas turbine. However, the class looked to become just another desktop project.

In the early 1980s, a series of submarine incidents occurred within Swedish territorial waters, the most famous of which was U 137 which ran aground outside Karlskrona in 1981. These incidents showed that the Swedish Navy was seriously lacking in its anti-submarine (ASW) capacity. Specifically, it needed new hulls designed for anti-submarine warfare, and it needed them fast. The decision was to use the Ytattack-81 project and modify it for ASW operations, as designing a completely new ship is a time-consuming and costly task. It was given a towed array sonar, ASW torpedoes and the ELMA anti-submarine mortar system. HSwMS Stockholm was launched on 22 August 1984 closely followed by HSwMS Malmö on 23 March 1985, both ships entered service on 1 May 1986.

In the middle of the 1990s, the ships started to show their age, mainly because of their high mileage and the latest few year's explosive development of electronics. The Stockholm class was a successful design and the ships' basic status was good despite a hard life so the Swedish Defence Administration decided to give the ships a second life. Malmö was the first to be modernised in 1999 with Stockholm following in 2000. The modernisation included new engines, combat control systems, fire control systems, SIGINT and navigational systems. The ships both went through extensive modification of the mast, hull and superstructure to reduce their radar cross-section. Much of the modification was also made with low maintenance in mind to minimise the need for expensive repairs in the future. The guiding principle for the project was to update as many of the systems as possible to the same level as the Visby-class corvettes. Both ships are back in operational condition now, attached to the 31st Corvette Division of the 3rd Naval Warfare Flotilla.

In early 2009 the Swedish government decided that the two ships in the class were to join the EU-led taskforce outside Somalia, where it would fight piracy. In May 2009 the ships started their first patrol off the Somali coast. On 26 May, Malmö responded to a pirate attack on the Greek ship MV Antonis. The corvette fired warning shots with its 57 mm cannon and arrested seven pirates.

In 2015, Saab was awarded a contract to overhaul the Stockholm-class corvettes and the ships were redesignated as patrol boats. The ships retained most of their weaponry and continued to be stationed at the Karlskrona naval base.

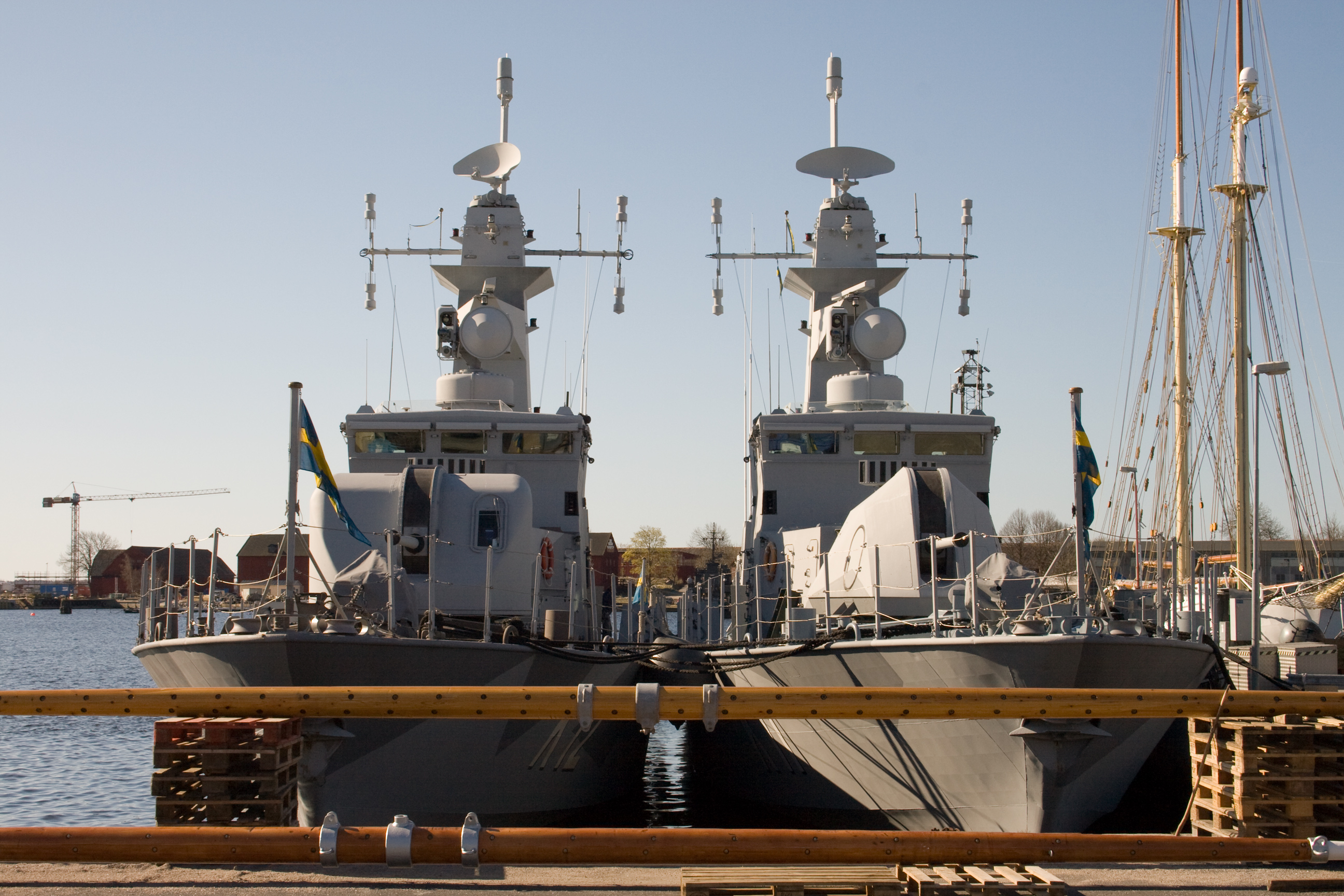
K12 HSwMS Malmö & K11 HSwMS Stockholm

The crew complement was reduced so not all weapon and sensor stations can be operated simultaneously, instead they will get two crews so the ships can stay at sea for more days of the year.

== Units ==
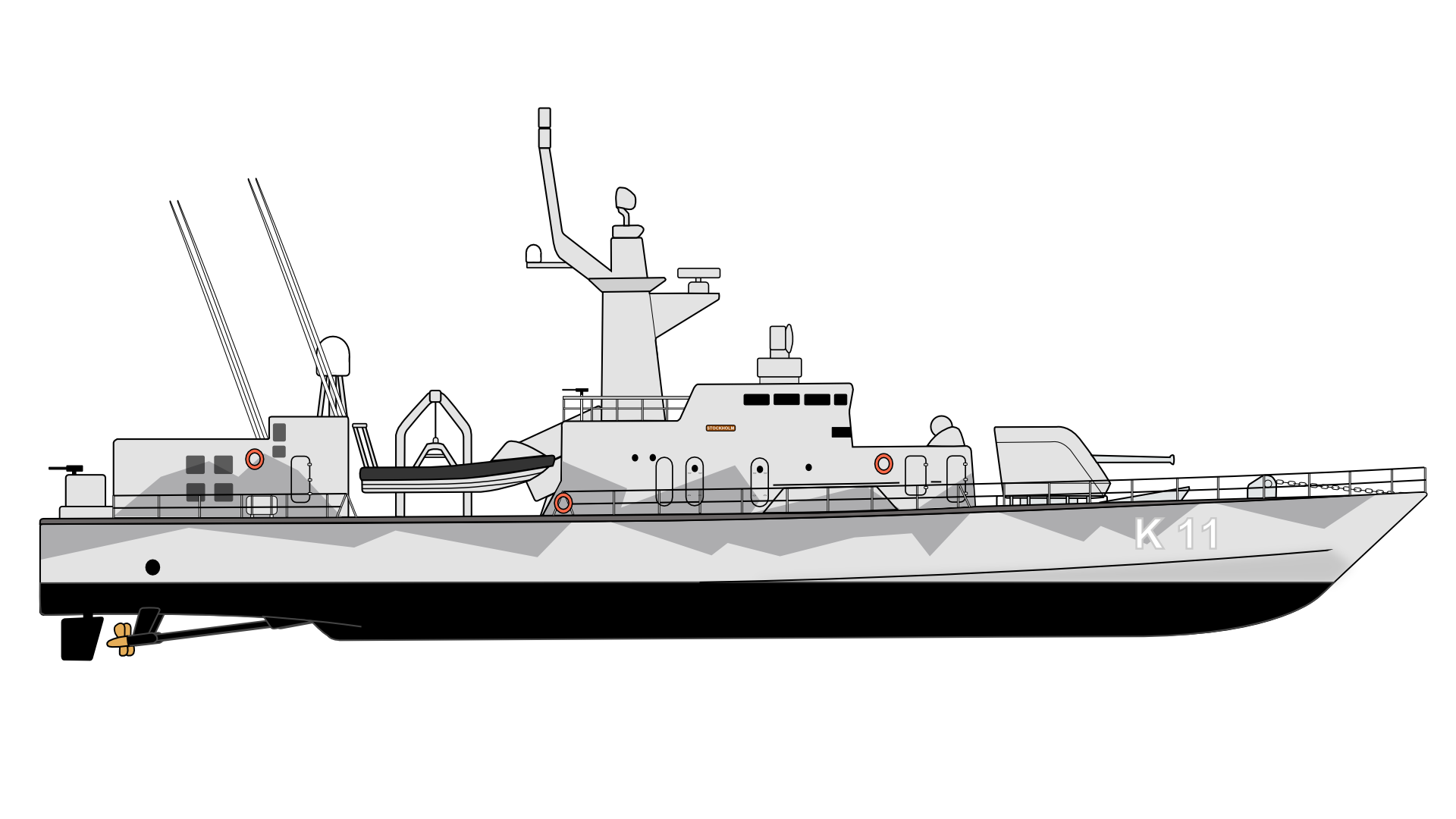
HSwMS Stockholm drawing

| Bow number | Ship name | Laid down | Launched | Commissioned | Service | Status |
|---|---|---|---|---|---|---|
| K11, later P11 | Stockholm | 1 August 1982 | 22 August 1984 | 1 May 1986 | 3rd Naval Warfare Flotilla | Modernised 2000, Active |
| K12, later P12 | Malmö | 14 March 1983 | 23 March 1985 | 1 May 1986 | 3rd Naval Warfare Flotilla | Modernised 1999, Active |
