= HSwMS Stockholm (P11) =

Swedish Stockholm-class corvette

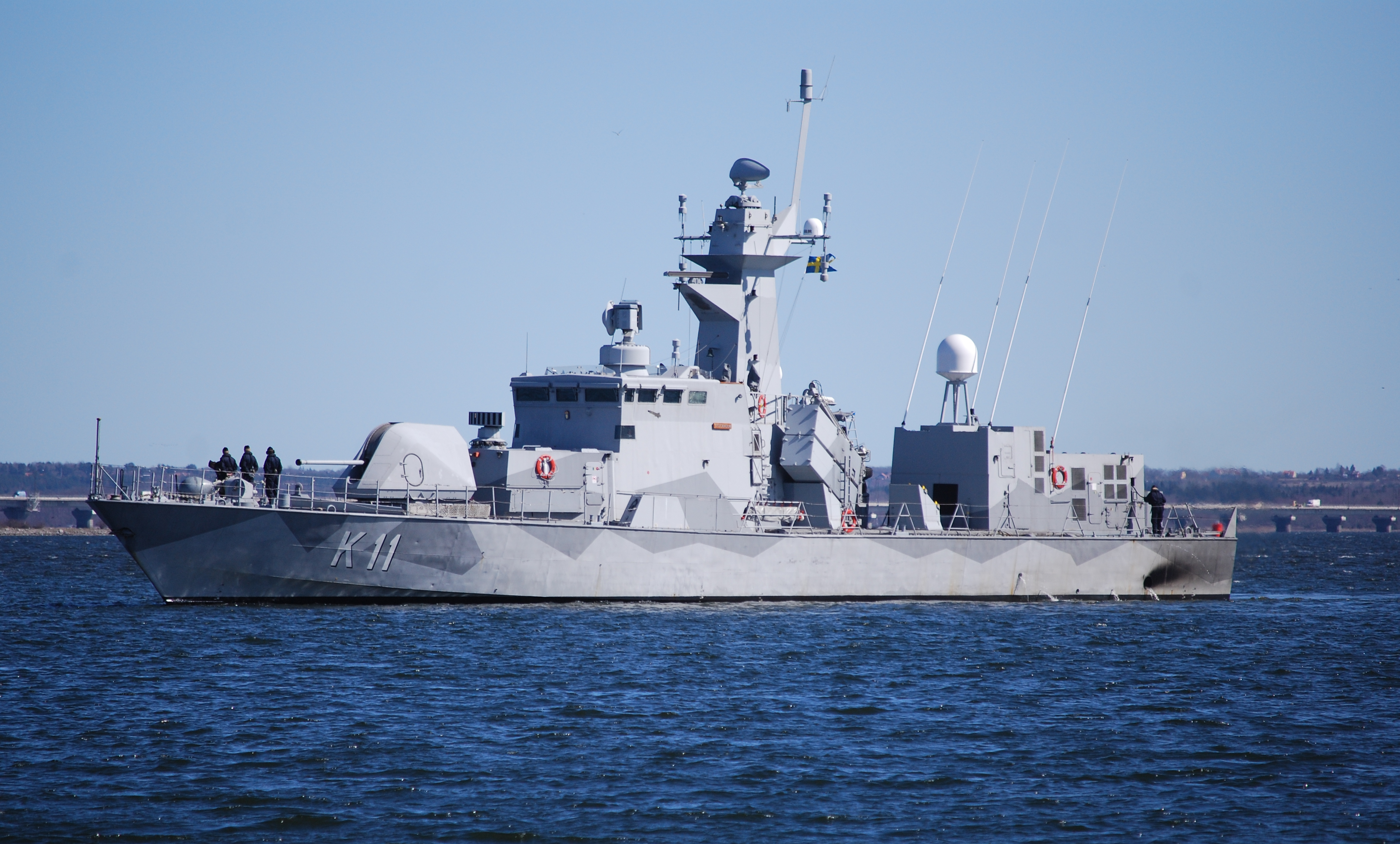
- HSwMS Stockholm

History

Sweden
- Name: Stockholm
- Namesake: Swedish city Stockholm
- Builder: Karlskronavarvet, Karlskrona
- Laid down: 1 August 1982
- Launched: 22 August 1984
- Commissioned: 22 February 1985
- Reclassified: 2016
- Home port: Karlskrona, Sweden
- Identification: MMSI number: 266036000; Pennant number: K11 (1985–2016); P11 (2016–present)
- Status: in active service
- Badge

General characteristics
- Class & type: Stockholm-class corvette
- Displacement: 380 tonnes (374 long tons)
- Length: 50 m (164 ft 1 in)
- Beam: 7.5 m (24 ft 7 in)
- Draft: 2.6 m (8 ft 6 in)
- Speed: 30 knots (56 km/h; 35 mph)
- Complement: 19 officers; 15 conscripts
- Armament: 1 x Bofors 57 mm Automatic Gun; 4 x 400 mm (16 in) torpedo tubes; 8 x RBS 15 missiles; 68 mines

HSwMS Stockholm (P11) is a patrol vessel belonging to the Swedish Navy. Together with her sister ship HSwMS Malmö, she forms the Stockholm class. Stockholm was delivered on 1 March 1985 as the lead ship for a surface combat flotilla. In 2002, a mid-life upgrade was carried out and in 2010, Stockholm is included together with sister ship in the 31st Corvette Division in the 3rd Naval Warfare Flotilla. In 2016, Stockholm was rebuilt into a Malmö-class patrol vessel.

== History ==
Stockholm was built by Karlskronavarvet and was launched on 22 August 1984, the christening was then done by then Minister of Defense Anders Thunborg. After trials the ship was delivered to the Navy on 1 March 1985, and then became the command ship for one of the then surface warfare flotillas.

=== Mid-life upgrade ===
During the year 2002, Stockholm underwent a mid-life upgrade where several changes were made. Among other things, the aft gun was removed and replaced by a superstructure containing a new modified towed sonar, the existing torpedo tubes were removed to make room for an extension of the existing superstructure. Furthermore, the mast was modified to reduce the radar signature, the guidance system was renewed, and the main machinery was replaced.

=== International service ===
In November 2008, it was announced that Stockholm, HSwMS Malmö and the support ship HSwMS Trossö would be part of unit ME01 in the Swedish standby force which would participate in the international operation Operation Atalanta which is ongoing in the Gulf of Aden along the east coast of Africa in protection against pirates.

On 21 October 2009, the ship returned to her home port at Karlskrona, the home transport took place on the cargo ship MV Eide Transporter.
