= HSwMS Malmö (P12) =

Swedish Stockholm-class corvette

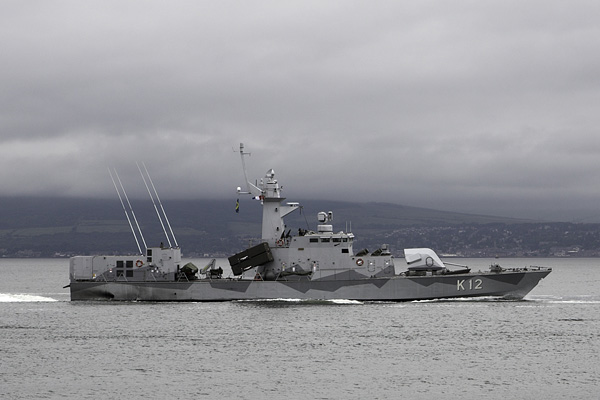
- HSwMS Malmö

History

Sweden
- Name: Malmö
- Namesake: Swedish city Malmö
- Builder: Karlskronavarvet, Karlskrona
- Laid down: 14 March 1983
- Launched: 22 March 1985
- Commissioned: 10 May 1985
- Reclassified: 2017
- Home port: Karlskrona, Sweden
- Identification: MMSI number: 266033000; Pennant number: K12 (1985–2017); P12 (2017–present)
- Status: in active service
- Badge

General characteristics
- Class & type: Stockholm-class corvette
- Displacement: 380 tonnes (374 long tons)
- Length: 50 m (164 ft 1 in)
- Beam: 7.5 m (24 ft 7 in)
- Draft: 2.6 m (8 ft 6 in)
- Speed: 30 knots (56 km/h; 35 mph)
- Complement: 19 officers; 15 conscripts
- Armament: 1 x Bofors 57 mm Automatic Gun; 4 x 400 mm (16 in) torpedo tubes; 8 x RBS 15 missiles; 68 mines

HSwMS Malmö (P12) is a patrol vessel belonging to the Swedish Navy. Together with her sister ship HSwMS Stockholm, she formed the Stockholm class. In 1999 she was set to begin her mid-life upgrade and in 2010 she was merged into the 31st Corvette Division of the 3rd Naval Warfare Flotilla along with her sister ship. In 2017, Malmö was rebuilt into a Malmö-class patrol vessel.

== History ==
Malmö was built by Karlskronavarvet and was launched on 21 Mars 1985. After trials the ship was delivered to the Navy on 8 November 1985, and then became the command ship for one of the then surface warfare flotillas.
