= Laivateollisuus =

Finnish shipbuilding company

Oy Laivateollisuus Ab
- Type: osakeyhtiö
- Industry: shipbuilding
- Founded: 1 February 1945; 81 years ago in Turku, Finland
- Founder: FÅA; AB Finland-Amerika Linjen Oy; Ab Oceanfart Oy
- Defunct: 1988 (yard closed); 1990 (removed from business register)
- Fate: merged to Wärtsilä Marine and closed
- Successors: Wärtsilä Marine; Late-Rakenteet
- Headquarters: Pansio, Turku, Finland
- Parent: Valmet (1974–1986)

Oy Laivateollisuus Ab (LaTe) was a Finnish shipbuilding company located in Pansio, Turku. The company was founded in 1945 to serve Finnish war reparation industry and focused on wooden ships. The first vessels were a series of schooners; they were followed by other wooden vessels. The last wooden hulls were produced in 1958. The company continued producing wooden gluelam structures in parallel with shipbuilding.

LaTe specialised in research vessels, for which main customer was the Soviet Union. In 1973 it was taken over by Valmet, which merged it with the adjacent Pansio shipyard in 1983. Between 1983 and 1986 the company operated under name Valmetin Laivateollisuus Oy, after which the original name was restored.

In 1987 Valmet put together its shipbuilding together with Wärtsilä under new company Wärtsilä Marine. The Laivateollisuus yard was discontinued in 1988 and the gluelam structure production was continued by new owners under name Late-Rakenteet Oy.

The nearby Laivateollisuus neighbourhood, originally built for the yard workers, is protected and listed as one of the Finnish cultural environments of national significance.

== Background ==
After the Continuation War between Finland and Soviet Union ended in the Moscow Armistice of 1944, Finland had to pay large war reparations. The whole sum had to be paid in goods; over one-fifth of the value consisted of vessels. The oddest vessels included in the list were 90 wooden 300-tonne schooners. As all shipyards in Finland had already moved to steel as a construction material decades ago, it was challenging to find experts in the field. It turned out that in the whole country there were just three people who had the required know-how for designing of such ships. One of them was Kaarlo Pulli, who had evacuated his business to Rauma after Koivisto, where his premises were located, was ceded to the Soviet Union with the rest of the Karelian Isthmus. Another was Porvoo engineer Gösta Kynzell, who had previous experience from wooden schooners. The third was Jarl Lindblom, technical manager of Turku Boat Works. A delegation from the War Reparation Industry (Soteva) ordered from Kynzell preliminary sketches, which were turned into firm plans by Lindblom.

== Foundation ==
As all the significant Finnish shipyards were fully occupied producing steel ships as war reparation, the wooden ships needed new premises. A new company, Oy Laivateollisuus Ab ("Shipbuilding Ltd"; LaTe), was founded in Pansio, Turku on 1 February 1945. The founders were ship operators Finland Steamship Company (FÅA), Ab Finland — Amerika Linjen Oy and Ab Oceanfart Oy. Construction of the premises began in spring 1945 and production started the following year. Architect Erik Bryggman was assigned to make plans for a neighbourhood for the shipyard personnel.

The following month captain Filip Hollming founded F.W. Hollming Oy in Rauma together with Pulli, August Mannonen and Hugo Pöntynen. F.W. Hollming Oy was assigned to produce some of the schooners.

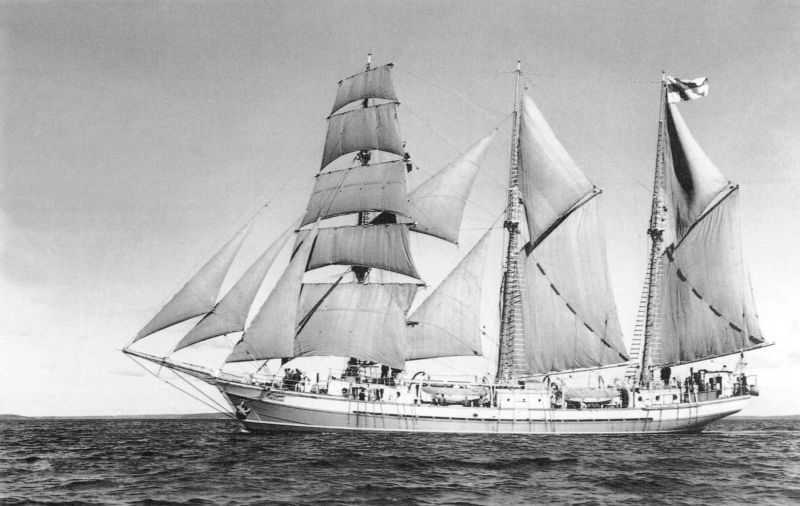
The Meridian during sea trials in September 1948.

== War reparation ships ==
The war reparation programme included three different types of three-mast merchant ships. Seventeen were barkentines with square rigs on the fore masts; the total sail area was 822 m². The other two types were schooners with 834–840 m² sail area; these featured conventional gaff rigs or Bermuda rigs. Cargo schooners had a hold of 525 m³. The total length of each ship was 49.25 metres, width 8.75 metres and hull height 3.9 metres. The ships were also powered by a 285-hp hot-bulb engine. The first ones had Swedish June-Munktell engines; these were gradually replaced starting in May 1948 by a Valmet-produced unit called the Siuro, and the ships of the series featured British Mirrlees engines. LaTe produced 15 of the training ships, the remaining 30 of its output being cargo schooners.

=== Ramping up production ===
Unlike Hollming, which relied on traditional shipbuilding methods, LaTe wanted to invest in productivity. Lindblom, who had been appointed technical manager, put effort into rationalisation and serial production. The ships could be built largely indoors inside a 188-metre-long hall that featured two production lines. There was enough of capacity to build eight ships at a time. The hall was 14 metres high and had three floors. The hulls and all round timber were produced on the ground floor. Decks and interior outfitting were produced on the first floor. The second floor included model and lifeboat workshops; sails were also produced there. Each process had dedicated workers. The first schooner was handed over on the last day of 1947, but soon after a new vessel was being launched every three weeks. The normal production time was 14 to 15 months, but at its shortest it was under one year.

=== Raw material issues ===
The sudden increase of wooden ship production caused lack of suitable raw material. Along with the schooners, Finland also had to deliver 200 composite barges of 1000 tonnes each. As a solution, LaTe started testing gluelam structures at Lindblom's initiative. This required a number of tests and negotiations with the Soviet inspectors. The tests proved that gluelam technology enabled strong structures to be made from relatively thin timber and that it prevented cracking. The first applications were masts and ribs, but soon the gluelam structures were approved for all applications. The glue used in the structures was shipped from California.

=== Zarya ===
The last war reparation schooner was the non-magnetic research vessel Zarya, which had been added into the programme. She was equipped with research laboratories and received the nickname "Gold Schooner" because she was the most expensive ship of the series. The anchor was made from bronze alloy and its 375-metre long chain was produced from silicon bronze. Bollards and the rudder were also made from bronze alloy. The ballast was lead. From a construction point of view, the most challenging parts in the ship were the eight fuel and fresh water tanks, which had complex shapes because of space constraints. Zarya was the last war reparation schooner; she was handed over on 19 September 1952.

== Other war reparation projects ==
After completing the schooner project, LaTe built nine "transferring trawlers", which were made as compensation for German property that remained in Finland. The trawlers were 23.6 metres long and featured sails and a 200-hp engine.

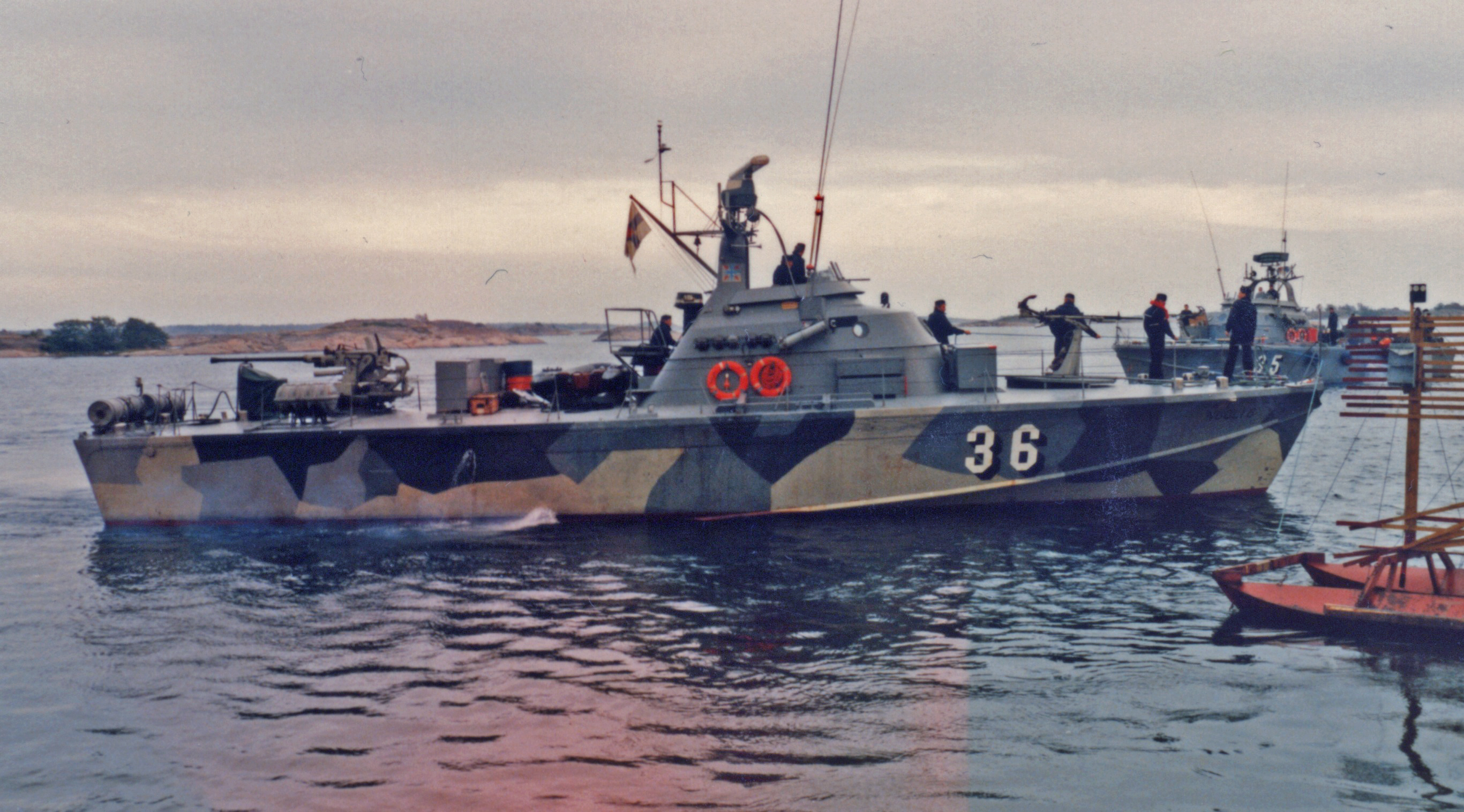
Nuoli-class gunboat.

== Last wooden ships ==
After the war reparations were completed, LaTe continued selling vessels to Soviet Union within the framework of a Finno-Soviet trading agreement. By end of 1957, LaTe had built 71 wooden 300-dwt fishing and sealing ships. In 1958 the company handed over to Soviet Union 12 marine research vessels of 720 dwt tonnage. The vessels were specially made for Arctic waters.

During 1961−1966 LaTe built 13 Nuoli-class fast gunboats for the Finnish Navy. The boats had a top speed of 40 knots. They were the last LaTe-produced vessels with wooden hulls.

The experience gained in gluelam led to a flourishing business. LaTe's gluelam beams were produced for the construction industry.

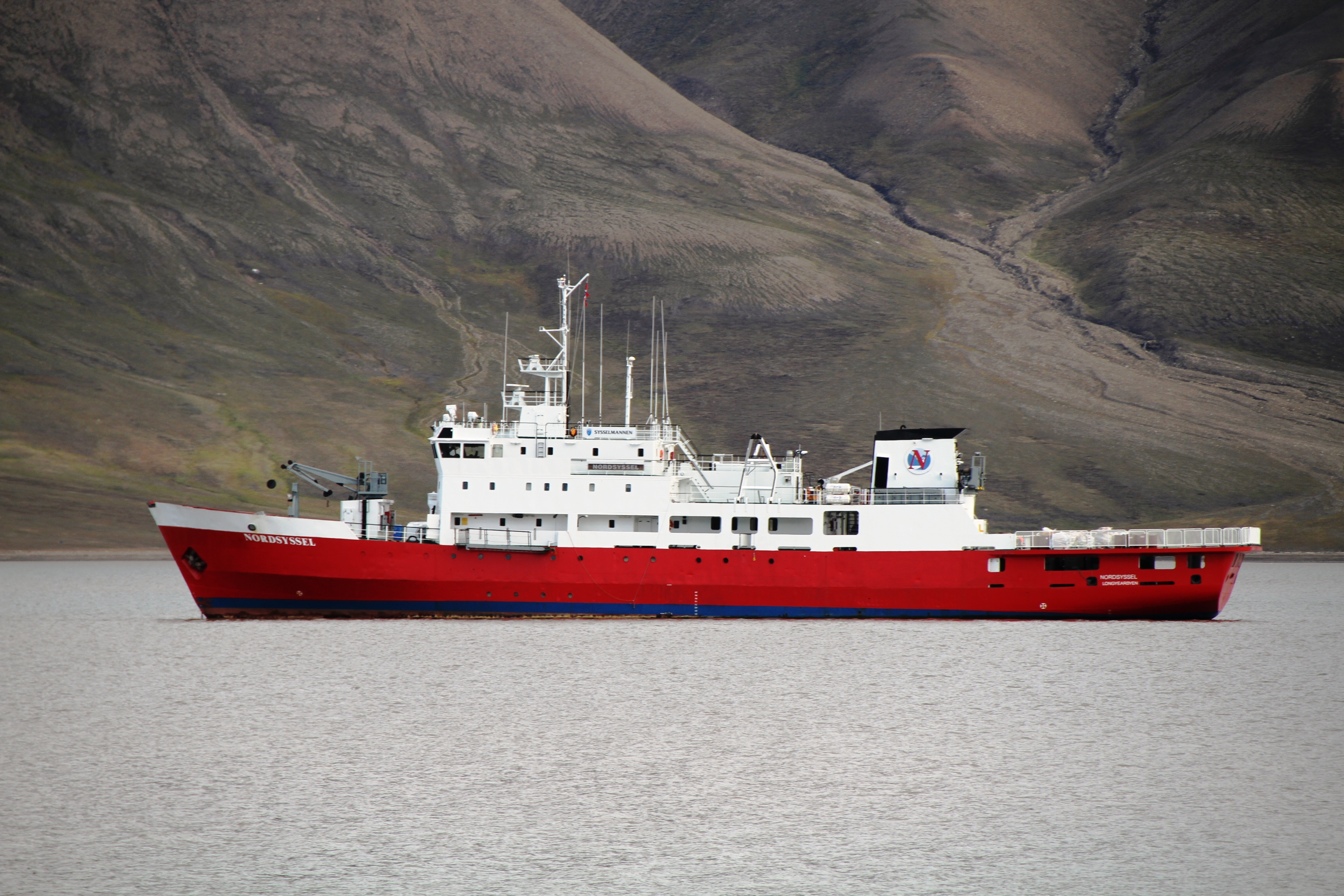
Norwegian research vessel Nordsyssel.

== Takeover by Valmet ==
LaTe's main market segment became research vessels and other special vessels. The neighbouring Valmet-owned Pansio shipyard had a similar portfolio, and in order to strengthen its position, Valmet took over Laivateollisuus in 1973. At first both yards continued operating as independent business units, but they were combined in 1983 under new name Valmetin Laivateollisuus Oy. The name was changed back to Oy Laivateollisuus Ab in 1986. During the 1970s LaTe started producing prefabricated cabins for ships and prefabricated roof modules for construction industry.

== Wärtsilä Marine ==
In 1986 Valmet and Wärtsilä agreed merging their shipbuilding businesses under the new company Wärtsilä Marine, in which Valmet retained a 30% share. As a part of restructuring, the company decided to close the Laivateollisuus yard in 1988. In December of that year the gluelam production was sold to a consortium formed by three workers. Gluelam structure producer Late-Rakenteet Oy started operation on 1 January 1989. Oy Laivateollisuus Ab was officially closed in 1990.

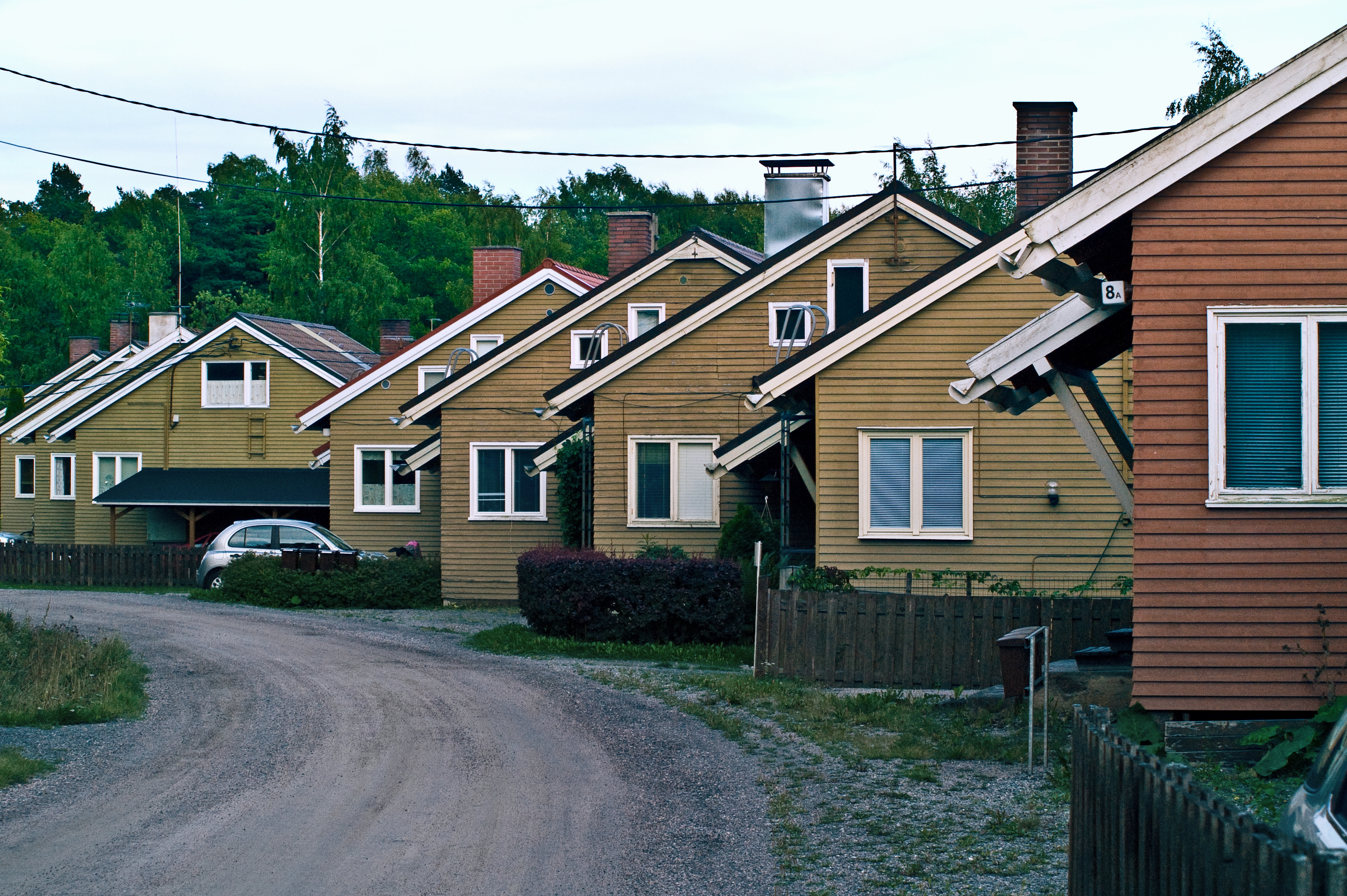
View on Laivateollisuus neighbourhood.

== Laivateollisuus neighbourhood ==
In 1945 architect Erik Bryggman planned homes and a streetplan for the yard workers. The area consists of small prefabricated houses for 90 families, arranged according to the area topography. Each consisted originally of two bedrooms, a kitchen, a bathroom, a closet and a shed. Although some of the houses have since been modified, the area has kept its original appearance. The area was protected in 1995 and later listed as a cultural environment of national significance.

== Sources ==
- Grönros, Jarmo; Kujanen, Hannu; Priamursky, G.; Rinta-Tassi, Osmo; Saarinen, Jarmo; Teräs, Kari; Trofimov, S. (1996). Aurajoen rautakourat — Järnnävarna vid Aura Å (in Finnish and Swedish). Turku, Finland: Turun maakuntamuseo — Åbo landskapsmuseum. ISBN 951-595-020-1.
