= Chromebook procurement scandal =

Indonesian ministerial scandal

The Chromebook procurement scandal or Chromebookgate is a corruption case in Indonesia that involved the procurement of Chromebook laptops worth IDR 9.9 trillion ($601 million) by the Ministry of Education, Culture, Research, and Technology (Kemendikbudristek) between 2019 and 2023. The investigation was started by the Attorney General's Office of Indonesia (Kejagung) on 20 May 2025.

Nadiem Makarim, founder of Gojek and former Minister of Education, was named a suspect in September 2025 alongside his former special staffer Jurist Tan, his former technology consultant Ibrahim Arief (Ibam), and two civil servants who were former directors at the Ministry of Education. Jurist Tan, who previously also worked as Chief Operating Officer at Gojek, already fled the country before the trials.

After Nadiem was named as a suspect, the Corruption Eradication Commission (KPK) revealed that they were also about to name Nadiem as a suspect in a corruption case related to the procurement of Google Cloud, but the KPK decided to let the Attorney General's Office handle the case since the Cloud case was related to the Chromebook case.

== Background ==
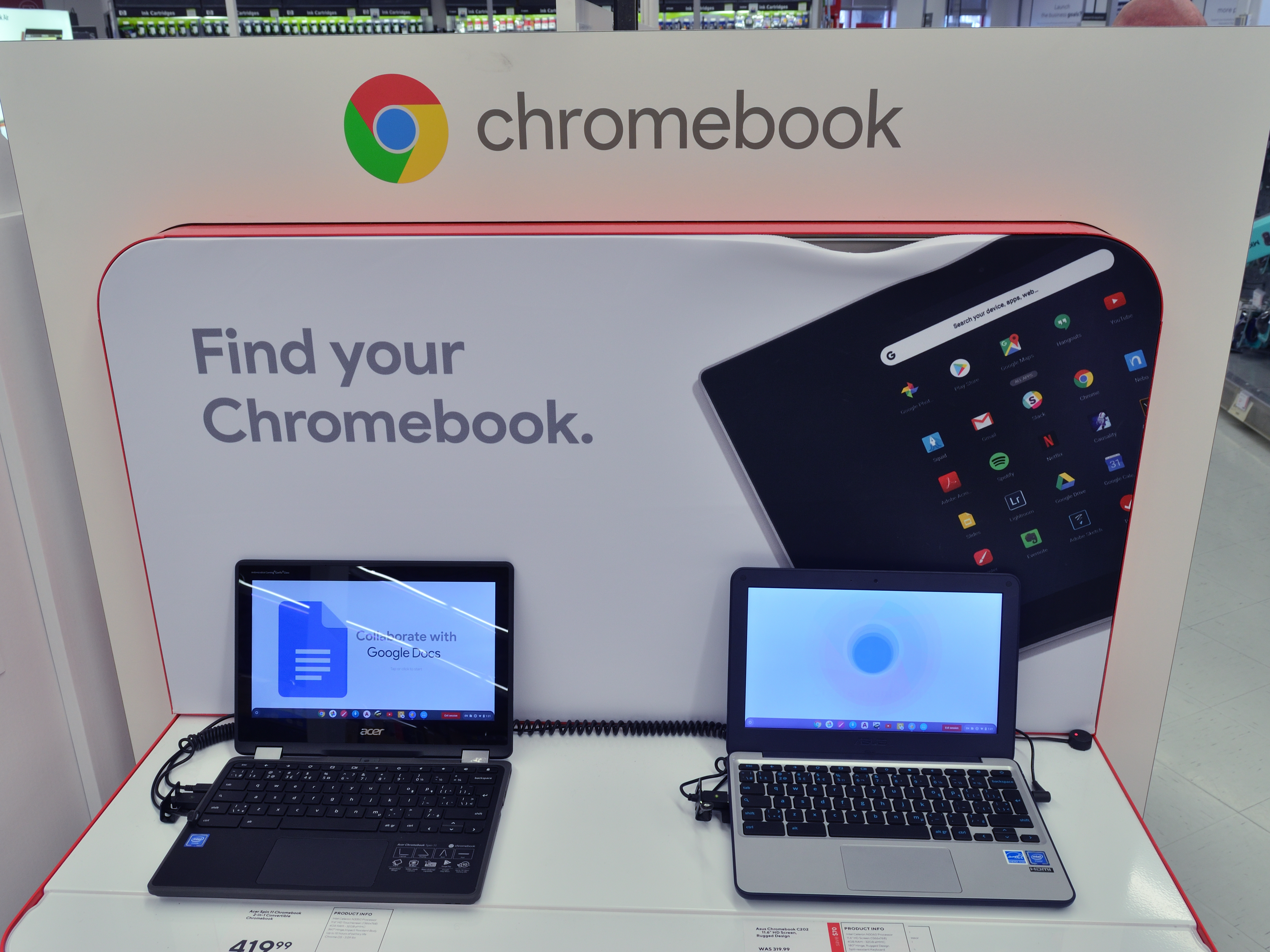
Chromebooks at a Staples retail store, 2020

According to Harli Siregar, the head of the Legal Information Centre (Kapuspenkum) at Kejagung, the case began in 2020 when Kemendikbudristek designed a budget for the procurement of technological devices for Minimal Competence Assessment. The technical team originally recommended that they use the Microsoft Windows operating system, but instead they later changed to Chromebook for unclear reasons.

The ministry under Nadiem put forward a state budget of IDR 9.98 trillion that included IDR 3.58 trillion specially allocated for procuring Chromebooks, and IDR 6.39 trillion from specially-allocated funds (DAK).

However, back in 2019, the Communication and Technology Centre (Pustekom) at Kemendikbud had already conducted trials on the Chromebook, testing its suitability for use in different parts of Indonesia. The results of the trials were negative, particularly because Chromebook was dependent on internet connection while many Indonesian rural regions still had poor internet access. In 2021, Indonesia Corruption Watch (ICW) had also raised concern about the potential corruption of this procurement.

== Investigation ==
=== Initial raid ===
The head of the Legal Information Centre at Kejagung, Harli Siregar, alleged that there was collusion in this procurement case. In early June 2025, 40 witnesses surrounding the scandal were examined by the Attorney General's Office. Among them were two (later three) special staffers under then-education minister Nadiem Makarim.

The Attorney General's Office also raided two apartment rooms owned by the former staffers, each located at Kuningan Place and The Orchard Satrio @ Ciputra World 2. During the raids, 4 smartphones, 2 laptops, 15 agenda books, a USB flash drive, and other supporting documents were confiscated as evidence. They were Fiona Handayani, who previously served as an analyst from McKinsey & Company and a staff of deputy governor of Jakarta, and Jurist Tan, former COO of Gojek and Nadiem's Special Staff at the ministry.

Ibrahim Arief, former consultant for Nadiem, was also questioned by the prosecutors on 12 June as a witness in the scandal and again on 15 July. Jurist Tan's questioning was scheduled for 11 June, but she requested to delay it by 6 days.

The Attorney General's Office later revealed that there were five vendors involved in the scandal: local consumer electronic and laptop manufacturers Advan Digital, Axioo, Zyrex, as well as office electronics providers Evercoss and PT Supertone (SPC Indonesia).

On 23 June, Nadiem was investigated by Kejagung, and he was prevented from travelling overseas for 6 months. The Jakarta headquarters of Gojek parent company GoTo was later raided by Kejagung officials on 8 July. During this raid, documents, letters, and USB flash drives were confiscated. The raid was followed by the interrogations of Andre Soelistyo, the former CEO of GoTo, on 14 July, and of Melissa Siska Juminto, a stockholder at GoTo, on the next day.

The prosecutors also discovered and investigated two WhatsApp groups created by Nadiem. Jurist Tan and education expert Najeela Shihab were among the members of those groups.

=== Suspects ===
On 16 July, the Attorney General's Office named four individuals as suspects in this scandal: Sri Wahyuningsih (the Primary School Director at the Directorate General of Preschool, Primary, and Secondary Education from 2020 to 2021), Mulyatsyah (the Junior Secondary School Director at Kemendikbudristek in 2020), Ibrahim Arief (Consultant for School Resources Management Technological Infrastructure Repair Planning), and Jurist Tan. However, Jurist was abroad at that time, while Ibrahim had been placed under city arrest due to a heart condition.

On 4 September 2025, Nadiem was arrested and subsequently named as a suspect for his involvement in the scandal.

== Trial and convictions ==
The trial began on 16 December 2025 at Central Jakarta Anti Corruption Court after the attorney general's office named four suspects: former Education Minister Nadiem Makarim, tech consultant Andi Arief, and the ministry officials Mulyatsyah and Sri Wahyuningsih. The four were all charged under Indonesia's Anti-Corruption Law for abuse of ministerial authority and for manipulating technical review processes. The prosecution team under Public Prosecutor Roy Riyadi, presented a 1,597-page indictment.

=== Shadow Minister ===
At a hearing on 13 January 2026, ministry official Cepy Lukman Rusdiana testified that colleagues referred to Jurist Tan as "Bu Menteri" ("Mrs. Minister") because they considered her influence comparable to that of Nadiem Makarim. One former director at the ministry said Jurist Tan was seen as the "Real Minister". Another former directorate-general from the ministry who testified in the trial said Nadiem told his subordinates that what Jurist Tan said were his words too. Nadiem reportedly said this several times during the meetings, although he denied giving Jurist Tan excessive power.

Jurist Tan also had the power to manage the budget and remove officials. One senior ministry official, Poppy Dewi Puspitawati, believed that she was removed from her position for resisting the Chromebook plan as she feared the procurement might violate regulations. During the trial, the prosecutor asked Nadiem about Jurist Tan, who was also known as the "shadow minister", but Nadiem evaded answering the question directly.

During the trial, Jurist Tan had already left Indonesia and never published any statement defending Nadiem. According to an investigation by the Indonesian Anti-Corruption Community (MAKI), Jurist Tan was allegedly living in Sydney, Australia, with her husband and child.

=== Meeting with Google ===
On 20 April 2026, Nadiem's defence team presented three former Google executives—Scott Beaumont, Caesar Sengupta and William Florence—as defence witnesses by videoconference from Singapore. Nadiem, who initially denied meeting Google in 2019, later denied the meeting in 2020 was specifically about procuring Chromebooks. Nadiem also denied that Google's investment in his company was bribery.

Previously, the prosecutors alleged the meetings between Nadiem and Google were related to the Chromebook procurement, noting his personal business interest as Google was an investor in Nadiem's company, although the ministry already stated that Chromebook was not suitable for teachers and students in remote regions that have difficulty with internet access. Jurist Tan was also present during the meeting with representatives from Google, including Scott Beaumont, alongside Nadiem Makarim in February 2020, a few months before the procurement meeting in May 2020.

The prosecutor also said that Najeela Shihab and Nadiem Makarim met Google in 2020. During the meeting, Najeela Shihab sent a chat to Jurist Tan and asked how much budget the ministry had for procuring laptops that year, however Najeela Shihab had denied her involvement in the procurement.

The prosecutors alleged that the meeting with Google was part of the plan to approve the Chromebook procurement. Both Beaumont and Nadiem said there was no pre-agreement to procure Chromebooks.

=== Verdicts against Mulyatsyah and Sri Wahyuningsih ===
Two former officials at the ministry of education received their sentences in April 2026. Mulyatsyah and Sri Wahyuningsih were sentenced to four and a half years and four years in prisons, respectively. The prosecutors alleged they were trying to lead the procurement process toward Chromebook, and without a proper procedure. Although the court found that the procurement of Chromebook and its Chrome Device Management caused a significant state loss, Sri Wahyuningsih received lighter sentence because she did not benefit directly from the corruption and already worked in the ministry for 38 years. Sri Wahyuningsih was also ordered to pay IDR 500 million, while Mulyatsyah must pay IDR 2.28 billion, and their assets could be seized if they could not pay.

=== Verdicts against Ibrahim Arief ===
On 12 May 2026, the court delivered its first major rulings against tech consultant Ibrahim Arief (Ibam). He was sentenced to four years in prison and fined IDR 500 million after being found guilty under subsidiary charges related to abuse of authority in the procurement process. The court noted that despite initially identifying the infrastructure limitations of Chromebooks, he later actively supported their deployment in official presentations. According to the ruling, Ibrahim was not neutral as a consultant, and he was included in the team at the ministry to represent Nadiem's view instead of acting as an independent consultant. Ibrahim also knew the weaknesses of the Chromebook, yet still recommended it.

One of the judges also scrutinized the source of Ibrahim's salary as a consultant in the ministry. Ibrahim received his salary from an external party, the education group Pusat Studi Pendidikan dan Kebijakan (PSPK). During the trial, Ibrahim admitted that he was told to meet with Google's representatives in early 2020 by Najeela Shihab, the founder of PSPK. Najeela Shihab was also part of Nadiem Makarim's WhatsApp groups which were found by the prosecutors, although she had given the instructions to Ibrahim on a separate WhatsApp group called 'Kemendikbud Wartek'.

Two members of the five-judge panel, Eryusman and Andi Saputra, issued dissenting opinions arguing that Ibrahim should be acquitted of all charges. The dissenting judges stated that Ibrahim acted only as an information technology consultant, did not lobby budget officials to select Chromebooks, did not receive illegal benefits, and had even informed the ministry about Chromebooks' limitations. They concluded that there was no direct causal link between Ibrahim's actions and the alleged corruption scheme.

Following the verdict, Ibrahim publicly criticized the decision, labeling the ruling as "criminalization" and he would appeal the ruling to the Jakarta High Court, citing the dissenting opinions of two judges as part of the basis for the appeal. In August 2026, the Jakarta High Court increased his prison sentence to five years, and he must pay IDR 500 million. Additionally, Ibam must pay IDR 5 billion as the replacement money for the state loss or receive another four years in prison.

Rejecting the verdict, Ibam decided to bring this case to the Supreme Court of Indonesia. In response, the Attorney General's Office said they were ready to face Ibam's further appeal.

=== Verdicts against Nadiem Makarim ===
On 13 May 2026, the prosecution read its formal sentencing demand against former Education Minister Nadiem Makarim. Prosecutors demanded an 18-year prison sentence and an asset-recovery payment totaling IDR 5.68 trillion. Under the terms of the demand, failure to pay this restitution would result in an additional nine years of imprisonment, effectively bringing his total potential sentence to 27 years.

On 30 June 2026, the judges found Nadiem guilty and sentenced him to 10 years in prison. In its June 2026 judgment, the court also imposed a fine of IDR 1 billion and ordered Nadiem to pay IDR 809.59 billion in restitution. He was found guilty of abusing his power and corruption during his tenure as a minister, and that his Chromebook procurement corruption particularly affected students in rural regions. Nadiem was not found guilty of enriching himself personally, but the court determined that Nadiem's unlawful policy enriched the other parties, including Google, and benefitted his own corporate interests. The court also said that Nadiem did remove the officials who rejected his procurement for Chromebook. Additionally, the court suggested the prosecutors to investigate Nadiem further with money laundering statute. The prosecutors said they would check it first.

On the same day, Google also released a statement that they "never offered, promised or provided any benefits to Indonesian government officials in exchange for their decision to adopt Chromebooks or related products" and Google said their Chromebook could be operated offline, although the report from the ministry in 2019 concluded that Chromebook was not recommended because it required stable internet connection which became an issue in several regions.

Later during the press conference, visibly emotional Nadiem said he would appeal. The Attorney General's Office also said they would appeal, citing dissatisfaction of the 10 years prison sentence.

In September 2026, the High Court affirmed the guilty verdict from the lower court, however the prison sentence is reduced to 9 years, although Nadiem must pay IDR 1 billion and additional IDR 548 billion in restitution or face additional 6 years in prison. Following his verdict, Nadiem has decided to appeal once again to the Supreme Court.

== Reactions ==
The Deputy Minister of Primary and Secondary Education, Fajar Riza Ul Haq, stated that his institution will respect the investigation process by Kejagung surrounding the case. He also noted that the program had ended during Nadiem's leadership. Political analyst Hendri Satrio remarked on his Twitter (X) account that "even devils are angry" on the scandal. Indonesian Corruption Watch (ICW) found various oddities in the scandal, including being not urgent during the COVID-19 pandemic, violating the Presidential Regulation Number 123 of 2020, and not listed on Public Procurement Plan Information System.

In response to the scandal, former education and culture minister at the time, Nadiem Makarim, accompanied by lawyer Hotman Paris Hutapea and two other law experts, arrived at a press conference at Nusantara Foyer Room, The Darmawangsa in Jakarta on 10 June 2025. He claimed that the prices of individual Chromebooks are 10–30% cheaper at average, and the installation of ChromeOS is free compared to other operating systems. He also acknowledged that his institution had distributed 1.1 million laptops, 3G modems, and projectors into more than 77,000 schools throughout Indonesia.

The Financial and Construction Supervision Agency (BPKP) claimed that it has notified numerous recommendations to Kemendikbudristek between 2023 and 2024 regarding the program, including target accuracy, term, specification, and amount of laptops. In 2021, long before the scandal surfaced to the public, politician Djoko Edhi Abdurrahman connected the scandal with Luhut Binsar Pandjaitan, who owns a 51% share in Zyrex. The company then received from Kemendikbudristek, a procurement contract of 165,000 laptops worth IDR 700 billion.

=== Reactions during trial ===
Speaking to reporters at the Central Jakarta District Court, Nadiem called the 27-year effective sentence "unreasonable" and "harsher than punishments given to murderers or terrorists," adding that the demanded restitution vastly exceeded his actual net worth. His defense maintained that he never signed the physical procurement documents and that the OS choices were finalized legally by technical working groups to save money on software licensing fees. During the trial, former commercial executives from Google Asia Pacific testified remotely via video conference. They stated under oath that Google's commercial investments into the Indonesian private tech ecosystem were fully independent and had no correlation with the ministry's public school laptop procurement. During the media interview, Nadiem described the accusations against him as "crazy" since the authorities are unable to find the money that went to his personal pocket. Nadiem also said that his heart broke after all his service to the nation are returned with detentions.

The trial has attracted international media attention. The New York Times stated the trial is a sign of authoritarian overreach of Prabowo Subianto's government which has been highlighted for its ongoing erosion of its democratic institution since Prabowo took office in October 2024. Caesar Sengupta, a former Google executive who worked on the Chromebook contract, predicted that the Nadiem prosecution could severely affect foreign investment to Indonesia. Sengupta added that the verdict could make U.S. tech companies looking to invest in Indonesia to cancel its plans as they declare Indonesia as being "not worth the risk."

In a YouTube podcast interview, former Trade Minister Tom Lembong stated that the case could erode Indonesian image to foreign investors. He cited that GoTo Group, which is listed in Indonesia Stock Exchange has been a benchmark for foreign investors to observe the startup environment in Indonesia. Tom also stated foreign investors are concerned about the Indonesian authorities' inability to differentiate between legal corporate action and embezzlement of state funds. Former Coordinating Minister for Political and Security Affairs Mahfud MD also criticized the verdict against Nadiem and stated that the case was forced and lacked transparent evidence. In an interview, Mahfud assessed that Nadiem's position in this case was not appropriate to be directly linked to the technical aspects of budget management, because it was at the policy level.

== See also ==
- 2025 Pertamina corruption case, another corruption case under ongoing investigation since February 2025
