= John Calvin International School =

Former international school in Jakarta, Indonesia

Sekolah Dasar Swasta John Calvin International School was an international school in Pulomas, East Jakarta, Indonesia.

== History ==
It was an English-medium school that opened in 2007, with elementary and secondary education. Prior to its 2008 indefinite closure it had 110 students. A former minister of education, Wardiman Djojonegoro, had shares in the school.

In 2008 the school announced that it was closing indefinitely and that students may instead attend another school operated by the same organization, Saint Peter's School. Multiple parents reacted negatively against the school closure and stated they would not send their children to Saint Peter's.

Parents filed complaints with the police and lawsuits, accusing the school of fraud.
