= Abdul Mu'ti =

Indonesian politician (born 1968)

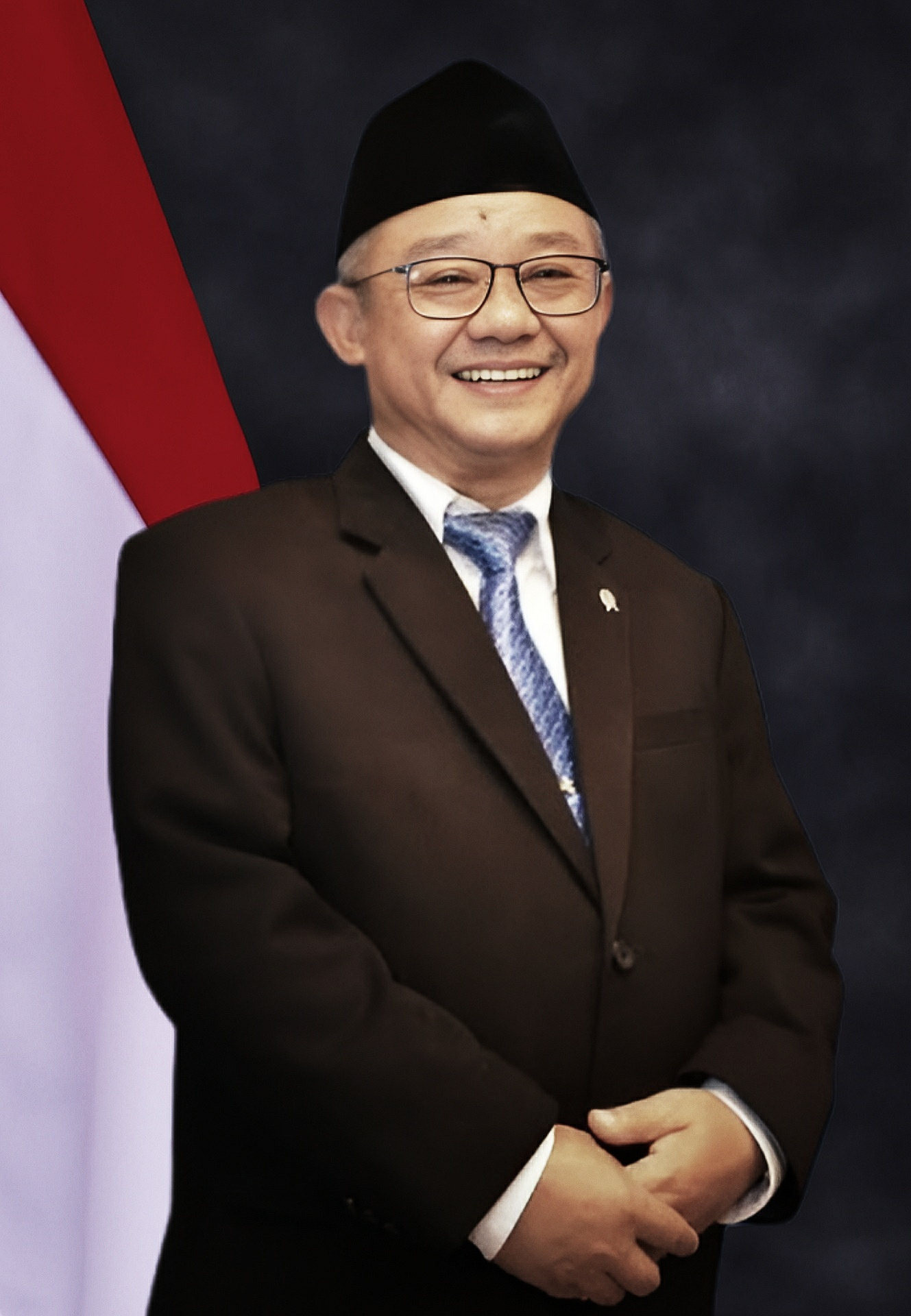
- Official portrait

Minister of Primary and Secondary Education
- Incumbent
- Assumed office 21 October 2024
- President: Prabowo Subianto
- Deputy: Atip Latipulhayat; Fajar Riza Ul Haq
- Preceded by: Nadiem Makarim

Secretary General of the Central Leadership of Muhammadiyah
- Incumbent
- Assumed office 2022

Personal details
- Born: 2 September 1968 (age 58) Kudus, Central Java, Indonesia
- Party: Independent
- Spouse: Masmidah
- Children: 3
- Education: Walisongo State Islamic University; Flinders University; Syarif Hidayatullah State Islamic University Jakarta

Abdul Mu'ti (born 2 September 1968) is an Indonesian academic and politician serving as Minister of Primary and Secondary Education since 2024. In 2022, he was elected secretary general of the Muhammadiyah.

== Early life and education ==
Abdul Mu'ti was born on 2 September 1968 as the eldest son of four children to Jamyadi and Kartinah. He completed his education at Madrasah Ibtidaiyah Manafiul Ulum Kudus (1980), Madrasah Tsanawiyah Negeri Kudus in 1983, and Madrasah Aliyah Negeri Purwodadi Filial in Kudus (1986). He continued his higher education at the Faculty of Tarbiyah, Walisongo State Islamic University, Semarang (1991). He received a Master of Education degree from the School of Education, Flinders University of South Australia in Adelaide (1997), took the Short Course on Governance and Shariah at the University of Birmingham UK (2005), and received a Doctorate degree from the Postgraduate Program at UIN Syarif Hidayatullah Jakarta (2008).

== Career ==
In 1993, Mu'ti began his career as a university lecturer in Walisongo State Islamic University until 2013. In 2014, he moved to Syarif Hidayatullah State Islamic University Jakarta.

In 2011 Abdul Mu'ti was appointed Chair of the National School/Madrasah Accreditation Board until 2017. In 2019, he was appointed Chair of the National Education Standards Agency until the agency's dissolvance by Minister Nadiem Makarim in 2021.

Aside from his educational career, he was also a member of Muhammadiyah since 1994 with member ID number 750178. He served as Secretary to the Muhammadiyah Central Java Regional Leadership for the period 2000-2002. Then in the 2002-2006 period he served as General Chair of the Muhammadiyah Youth Central Leadership. At that time he also served as Secretary of the Muhammadiyah Central Leadership Primary and Secondary Education Council from 2005-2010.

Abdul Mu'ti was a member of the Indonesian and United States Council on Religion and Pluralism, and the executive community of the Asian Conference of Religions for Peace. As a Muhammadiyah activist who is classified as moderate and tolerant, he is the deputy secretary of Religion Counter Terrorism and secretary of the National Council of Indonesian Muslim Intellectuals. Abdul Mu'ti's name was announced as being included in the 200 list of "Indonesian Missionaries" recommended by the Ministry of Religion on Friday 18 May 2018.

In December 2020, he refused the position of deputy minister of education and culture on the grounds that he did not want to join the Onward Indonesia Cabinet in the position of deputy minister. On the international stage, Abdul Mu'ti has been an Advisor at the British Council London since 2006. He is also active in writing books and various opinions in the media. He was also confirmed as Professor in the Field of Islamic Religious Education at UIN Syarif Hidayatullah Jakarta. The inauguration of the 1,050th professor was held on September 2, 2020.
