= Higher Education Service Institutes =

The Higher Education Services Institutes (Indonesian: Lembaga Layanan Pendidikan Tinggi, LLDIKTI) is a system of institutions formed by the Indonesian government to provide guidance to both public and private universities inside the jurisdiction of Indonesia. For most of its existence, the system was placed under the Ministry of Education and Culture, before being transferred to Ministry of Research, Technology, and Higher Education during Joko Widodo's first cabinet. It was briefly returned to the Ministry of Education and Culture, before being transferred again to the Ministry of Education, Culture, Research and Technology after second reshuffle of his second cabinet.

== History ==
In 1967, the Indonesian government at that time initiated the formation as a cooperation between the universities in Indonesia. The cooperation was later renamed Coordination of Higher Education Colleges (Indonesian: Koordinasi Pendidikan Tinggi, KOPERTI). On 17 February 1968, the KOPERTI was inaugurated by the Ministry of Education and Culture thru Ministry of Education and Culture Decree No. 1/PK/1968. When established, the KOPERTI had a consultative relationship with local representative offices of the Ministry in its responsible regions. When it formed initially, KOPERTI had 7 branches (East Java, Bali, West Nusa Tenggara, East Nusa Tenggara, South Kalimantan, Central Kalimantan, and East Kalimantan). However, with the increased formation of private universities in Indonesia, on 17 April 1975, thru Ministry of Education and Culture Decree No. 079/O/1975, the public universities were placed directly under the Ministry, no longer in KOPERTI, and KOPERTI's scope was limited to accommodate only private universities. Since it now only accommodated private universities, KOPERTI was renamed KOPERTIS (Indonesian: Koordinasi Pendidikan Tinggi Swasta, English: Coordination of Private Higher Education Colleges). The Ministry then carried out the cooperation, and fostering of the human resources of private universities through the KOPERTIS. When the number of private universities later peaked during 1980s - 1990s across Indonesia, the KOPERTIS was expanded from 7 branches to 12 branches thru Ministry of Education and Culture Decree No. 062/O/1982 and No. 0135/O/1990. Later thru Education and Culture Decree No. 1/2013, it expanded to 13 branches, and later to 14 branches thru Education and Culture Decree No. 42/2013.

During Joko Widodo's first presidency, he moved the Higher Education affairs to Ministry of Research and Technology, creating the Ministry of Research, Technology, and Higher Education. As a consequence, KOPERTIS also moved to Ministry of Research, Technology, and Higher Education. Mohamad Nasir, Minister of Research, Technology, and Higher Education later ended the "discriminatory practices" between the private universities and public universities, promising equalities in guidance from the Ministry and better collaboration between the private universities and public universities. During his time, KOPERTIS transformed into LLDIKTI thru Ministry of Research, Technology, and Higher Education Decree No. 15/2018 on 9 April 2018. Since then, LLDIKTI become the coordinator between private universities and public universities once more.

LLDIKTI later returned to Ministry of Education and Culture after Joko Widodo took his second presidency. In his second presidency, he returned Higher Education affairs to Ministry of Education and Culture. During Nadiem Makarim period as minister, LLDIKTI expanded into 16 branches thru Ministry of Education and Culture Decree No. 34/2020 on 21 July 2020. Later, LLDIKTI moved to Ministry of Education, Culture, Research, and Technology thru Ministry of Education, Culture, Research, and Technology Decree No. 28/2021 on 23 August 2021.

== Responsibilities ==
LLDIKTI responsibilities are:

- Higher education quality mapping
- Facilitating for the improvement of the quality maintenance of the higher education institutions
- Facilitating for the improvement the quality of higher education institutional management
- Facilitating for the readiness for the higher education institutions to external quality assurance
- Management of data and information of higher education institutions
- Evaluation and reporting the improvement of higher education quality
- Administration affairs

== Structure ==
All LLDIKTI branch offices are equal and responsible for the maintenance of higher education standards and fostering the human resources quality and cooperation between the private universities and public universities in their respective areas and all are equally answered to the Ministry of the Education, Culture, Research, and Technology. For development of organizational affairs and human resources of LLDIKTIs, the LLDIKTIs received technical guidance from the General Directorate of Higher Education (now General Directorate of Research, Technology, and Higher Education) and the General Directorate of Vocational Education of the Ministry of the Education, Culture, Research, and Technology, and administrative guidance from the General Secretariat of the Ministry of the Education, Culture, Research, and Technology.

All LLDIKTI institutions, regardless their area of responsibility, each has same organization structure:

- Office of the LLDIKTI Director (answered to the Minister directly)
  - Expert Staffs
- Office of the LLDIKTI Secretariat
  - Administration Division
  - Functionaries

== Branches ==
LLDIKTI possessed 16 branches across Indonesia.

- Higher Education Service Institute Branch I (North Sumatera Region)
- Higher Education Service Institute Branch II (South Sumatera, Lampung, Bengkulu, and Bangka Belitung Regions)
- Higher Education Service Institute Branch III (Jakarta Region)
- Higher Education Service Institute Branch IV (West Java and Banten Regions)
- Higher Education Service Institute Branch V (Yogyakarta Region)
- Higher Education Service Institute Branch VI (Central Java Regions)
- Higher Education Service Institute Branch VII (East Java Region)
- Higher Education Service Institute Branch VIII (Bali and West Nusa Tenggara Regions)
- Higher Education Service Institute Branch IX (South Sulawesi, South East Sulawesi, and West Sulawesi Regions)
- Higher Education Service Institute Branch X (West Sumatera, Riau, Jambi, and Riau Islands Regions)
- Higher Education Service Institute Branch XI (South Kalimantan, West Kalimantan, East Kalimantan, Central Kalimantan, and North Kalimantan Regions)
- Higher Education Service Institute Branch XII (Maluku and North Maluku Regions)
- Higher Education Service Institute Branch XIII (Aceh Region)
- Higher Education Service Institute Branch XIV (Papua and West Papua Regions)
- Higher Education Service Institute Branch XV (East Nusa Tenggara Region)
- Higher Education Service Institute Branch XVI (Central Sulawesi, North Sulawesi, and Gorontalo Regions)

== Parent organization ==
LLDIKTI, as apparatus of the ministry, had been moved from many ministries in its existence.

- Ministry of Education and Culture (1968–2015)
- Ministry of Research, Technology, and Higher Education (2015–2019)
- Ministry of Education and Culture (2019–2021)
- Ministry of Education, Culture, Research and Technology (2021–current)
