= Reza Chalid =

Indonesian businessman

Mohammad Riza Chalid (born 1959) also known as Reza Chalid is an Indonesian businessman who mainly runs a petroleum company.

Chalid's company Petral dominates Indonesian oil imports. His business is said to produce US$30 billion annually. He was listed as 88th richest Indonesian, according to GlobeAsia.

== Early life and Personal life ==
Riza Chalid was born in 1960 to Chalid bin Abdat (father) and Siti Hindun binti Ali Alkatiri (mother), both of Arab-Indonesian descent.

He married Roestriana Adrianti in 1985. They have two children: Muhammad Kerry Adrianto (born 1985) and Kenesa Ilona Rina (born 1989). His son, Kerry, was named a suspect and arrested in the 2025 Pertamina corruption case.

Chalid and Roestriana Adrianti divorced in 2012. According to the Indonesian anti-corruption group MAKI, in 2021, Chalid allegedly married a relative of the Kedah Royal Family in Malaysia and is suspected to have been living in Johor for some time.

Chalid has a sister, Lubna Sumyaryo binti Chalid Rachmat, who is the main commissioner of PT Oerip Mangkoedijaya Sumiskum—a company that was summoned by the BLBI Task Force in 2023 to collect outstanding debts of Rp31.04 billion and US$720,768.69. Lubna Sumyaryo is the mother of Ludmilla F. Sumiskum, who married Budisatrio Djiwandono—the nephew of President Prabowo Subianto and son of former Bank Indonesia Governor Soedradjad Djiwandono (1993–1998).

== Career ==
In 1997, Chalid represented PT Dwipangga Sakti Prima in an effort to purchase Sukhoi aircraft from Russia. PT Dwipannga Sakti Prima was said to be under scrutiny for marking up the price of Lockheed C-130 Hercules from United States to US$30 million while it could be purchased for US$25 million in the US. He was accompanied by Ginandjar Kartasasmita who was Minister of National Development Planning at the time and General Wiranto who was Armed Forces Chief of Staff.

He ran Pertamina Energy Trading Limited (Petral), handling oil imports from Singapore during his involvement in Petral. The Ministry of Energy and Mineral Resources stated that Petral was liquidated in 2015 due to legal troubles. He ran other energy companies such as Supreme Energy, Paramount Petroleum, Straits Oil, and Cosmic Petroleum; all based in Singapore but listed in British Virgin Islands.

Chalid was involved in other businesses, including Indonesia AirAsia, and Mexican indoor theme park chain KidZania, which located in Pacific Place Jakarta, a mall he co-owned with Tan Kian and Tomy Winata.

== Legal issues ==
He came under scrutiny due to his involvement in House of Representatives speaker Setya Novanto's corruption scandal involving the extension of operating rights for Freeport-McMoran in Papua. Novanto sent a letter demanding that Pertamina pay allegedly inflated costs for use of a fuel terminal, PT Orbit Terminal Merak, owned by Chalid.

In 2025, he was involved in the 2025 Pertamina corruption case that saw 18 people arrested within the Pertamina Patra Niaga, including his son Muhammad Kerry. His house in South Jakarta was raided by prosecutors after his son was arrested. In July 2025, Chalid was named as a suspect in the Pertamina corruption case. He was said to have fled to Singapore before he was named as a suspect however it was denied by the Singapore Foreign Ministry who said that he hasn't been in Singapore for some time. It is suspected that he had been living in Malaysia since his escape in February 2025.

Riza Chalid is currently wanted by Indonesian authorities and is still in hiding in Singapore On 2 February 2026, Chalid was officially put under Interpol red notice.

== Family network and BLBI connections ==
Chalid's sister, Lubna Sumyaryo, serves as the main commissioner of PT Oerip Mangkoedijaya Sumiskum. In 2023, the BLBI Task Force summoned the company to collect outstanding debts of Rp31.04 billion and US$720,768.69, stemming from the 1998 Bank Indonesia Liquidity Assistance (BLBI) program. Lubna's daughter, Ludmilla F. Sumiskum, is married to Budisatrio Djiwandono—nephew of President Prabowo Subianto and son of former Bank Indonesia Governor Soedradjad Djiwandono, who served during the period when BLBI was issued. This has drawn public attention to the intersection of elite family networks, corruption cases, and state debts in Indonesia.
