= Kevin Aluwi =

Indonesian entrepreneur (born 1986)

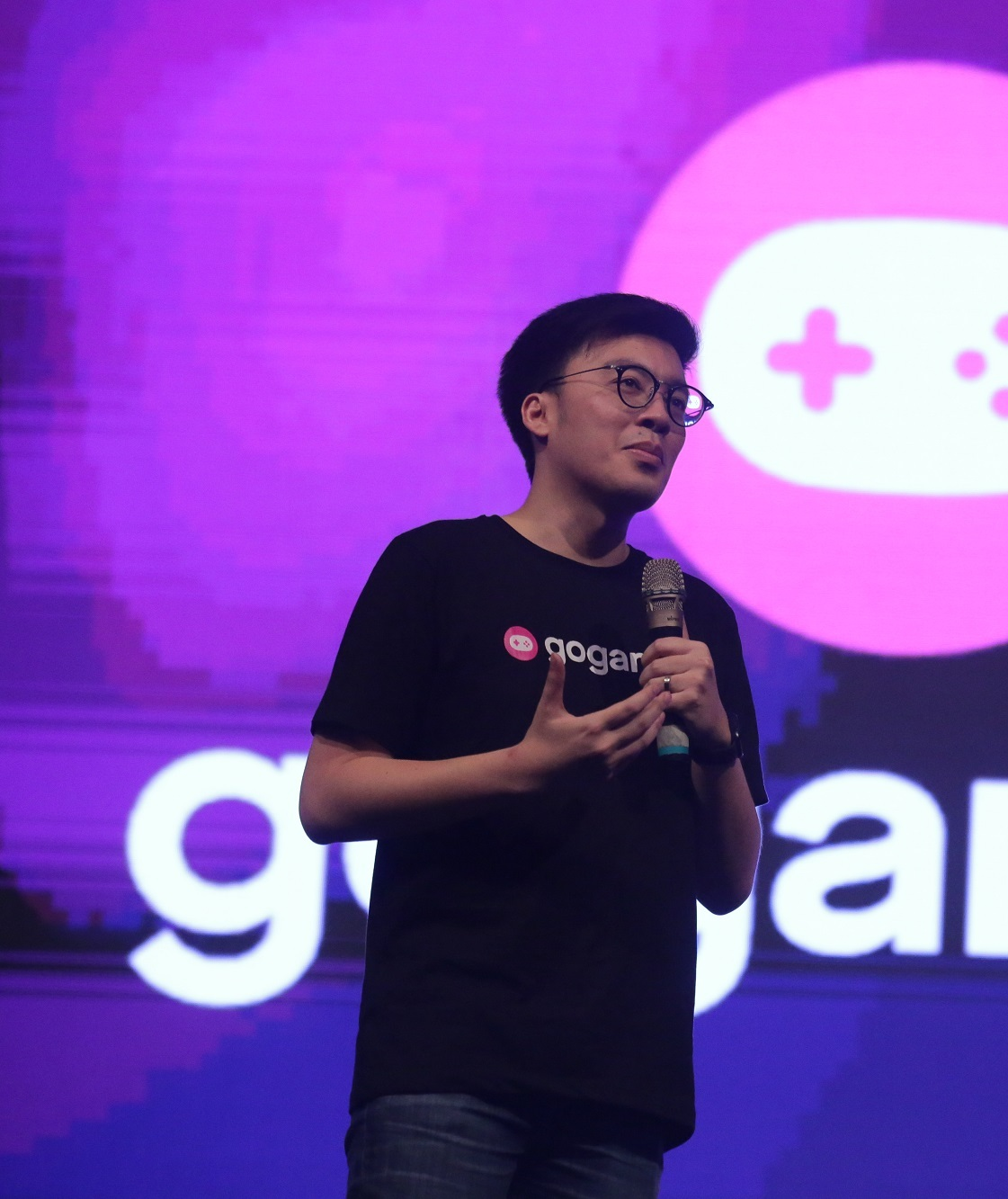
- Born: 1 September 1986 (age 39); Jakarta, Indonesia
- Education: University of Southern California
- Occupations: Internet entrepreneur; investor
- Known for: Co-Founder of Gojek
- Title: Co-CEO, Gojek (2019–2022)
- Spouse: Felicia Kawilarang (m. 2018; div. 2023)
- Awards: Forbes 30 Under 30 Asia (2016)

Kevin Aluwi (born 1 September 1986) is an Indonesian internet entrepreneur and investor. In 2010, he founded Gojek, Indonesia's first startup company valued over US$10 billion.

== Early life and education ==
Kevin holds a bachelor's degree in Corporate Finance, Entrepreneurship and International Relations from the University of Southern California - Marshall School of Business in Los Angeles, California, USA.

== Business career ==
=== Early career ===
Prior to joining Gojek, Kevin spent two years in Zalora Indonesia as the Head of Business Intelligence. Before Zalora, he was the Business Development Manager in Merah Putih. Inc.; following the start of his career as an Investment Banking analyst in Salem Partners LLC.

=== Gojek ===
As the co-founder of Gojek, Kevin Aluwi plays significant roles in navigating the company's journey into becoming Southeast Asia's leading technology platform whose mission is to empower the informal sector and MSMEs in Indonesia.

Joining Gojek in 2014, Kevin has since held a strategic role in adopting business intelligence data to track and optimize critical elements such as pricing, driver-partners income, as well as in structuring customers retention strategy. Kevin builds and established data science within Gojek ecosystem. As Gojek Group expands, Kevin leads all product streams to ensure continuous innovation and growth.

In Oct 2019, Kevin, along with Andre Soelistyo, Gojek Group president was promoted as co-CEOs after the departure of CEO Nadiem Makarim who stepped down to join Indonesia president Joko Widodo’s cabinet.

=== Lightspeed ===
Since January 2024, Aluwi is a venture partner at Lightspeed Venture Partners, a venture capital firm based in Singapore.

== Awards and honors ==
- Forbes 30 Under 30 Asia in Consumers Technology category in 2016; an award to recognize young innovator figures who succeeded in making changes and disrupting industries.

Business positions
| Preceded by Nadiem Makarim | CEO of Gojek; 2019–present | Incumbent |
