= 2025 Pertamina corruption case =

Indonesian corporate scandal

The 2025 Pertamina corruption case or sometimes known as PertaminaGate is an ongoing corruption case that involves Indonesian state-owned oil and natural gas corporation Pertamina in early 2025. The scandal involves the adulteration between subsidised petroleum with non subsidised petroleum. As of 2025, this is the largest corruption scandals in Indonesia, overtaking the PT Timah Tbk corruption scandal with the estimated total loss of Rp968,5 trillion (equivalent to US$58,94 billion).

== Background ==
Since 1960, Pertamina has been the sole player in Indonesian oil and gas market after the Provisional People's Consultative Assembly passed a policy that oil and gas exploration in Indonesia is only allowed to be carried out by the state until 2005 when the foreign oil and gas companies were allowed to operate in the country under strict conditions. In 1970s, Indonesia experienced an oil bonanza due to the 1970s energy crisis that caused the rising oil prices with Pertamina playing the key role in the boom. As the Indonesian oil sources started to gradually deplete, the government then allowed Pertamina to import its oil.

== Scandal ==
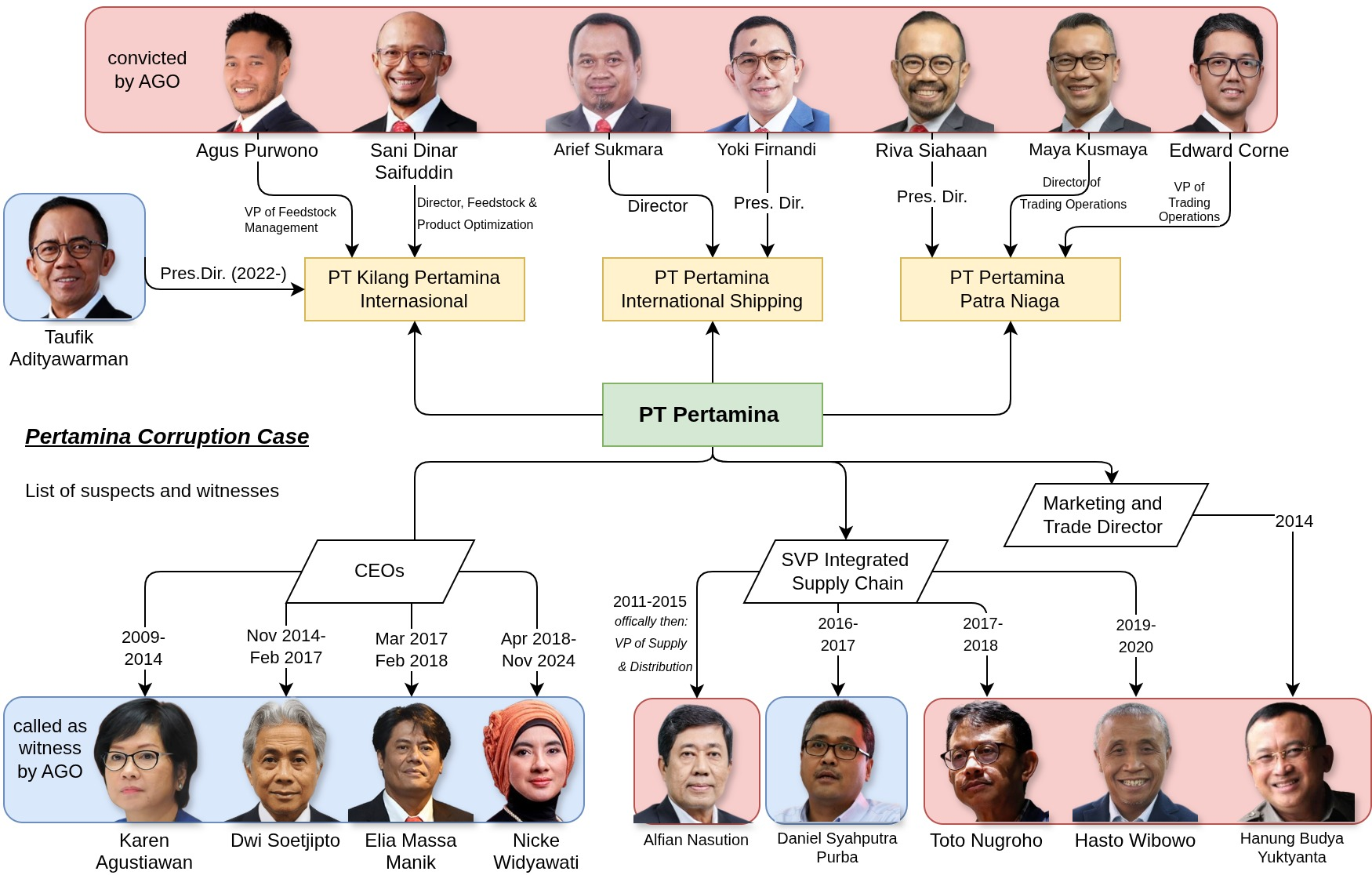
List of suspects and witnesses named by the AGO

On 25 February, Indonesian Attorney General Office found seven individuals including five executives who worked at PT Pertamina Patra Niaga, a subsidiary of Pertamina of corruption. The scandal dated back from the period of oil imports between 2018 and 2023. The alleged misconduct, which occurred between 2018 and 2023, reportedly resulted in state losses amounting to Rp 193.7 trillion (US$11.9–12 billion).

Among the suspects arrested, there are

- Riva Siahaan, the CEO of PT Pertamina Patra Niaga;
- Yoki Firnandi, CEO of Pertamina International Shipping;
- and Sani Dinar Saifuddin, Director at Kilang Pertamina Internasional.
- Alfian Nasution, VP of Supply & Distribution of PT Pertamina.

The three were arrested after being found out to be breaching the regulation that requires Pertamina to prioritise locally refined oils instead of import.

Additionally, among the private sector, businessman Muhammad Kerry Andrianto Riza was arrested for his involvement in the case. As a result of his arrest, Muhammad Kerry's father, oil baron Mohammad Riza Chalid's home in South Jakarta was also raided by the prosecutors in relation to investigation of the case.

Prosecutors also arrested Dimas Werhaspati, Commissioner of PT Navigator Khatulistiwa and PT Jenggala Maritim; and Gading Ramadhan Joedo, Commissioner of PT Jenggala Maritim and PT Orbit Terminal Merak.

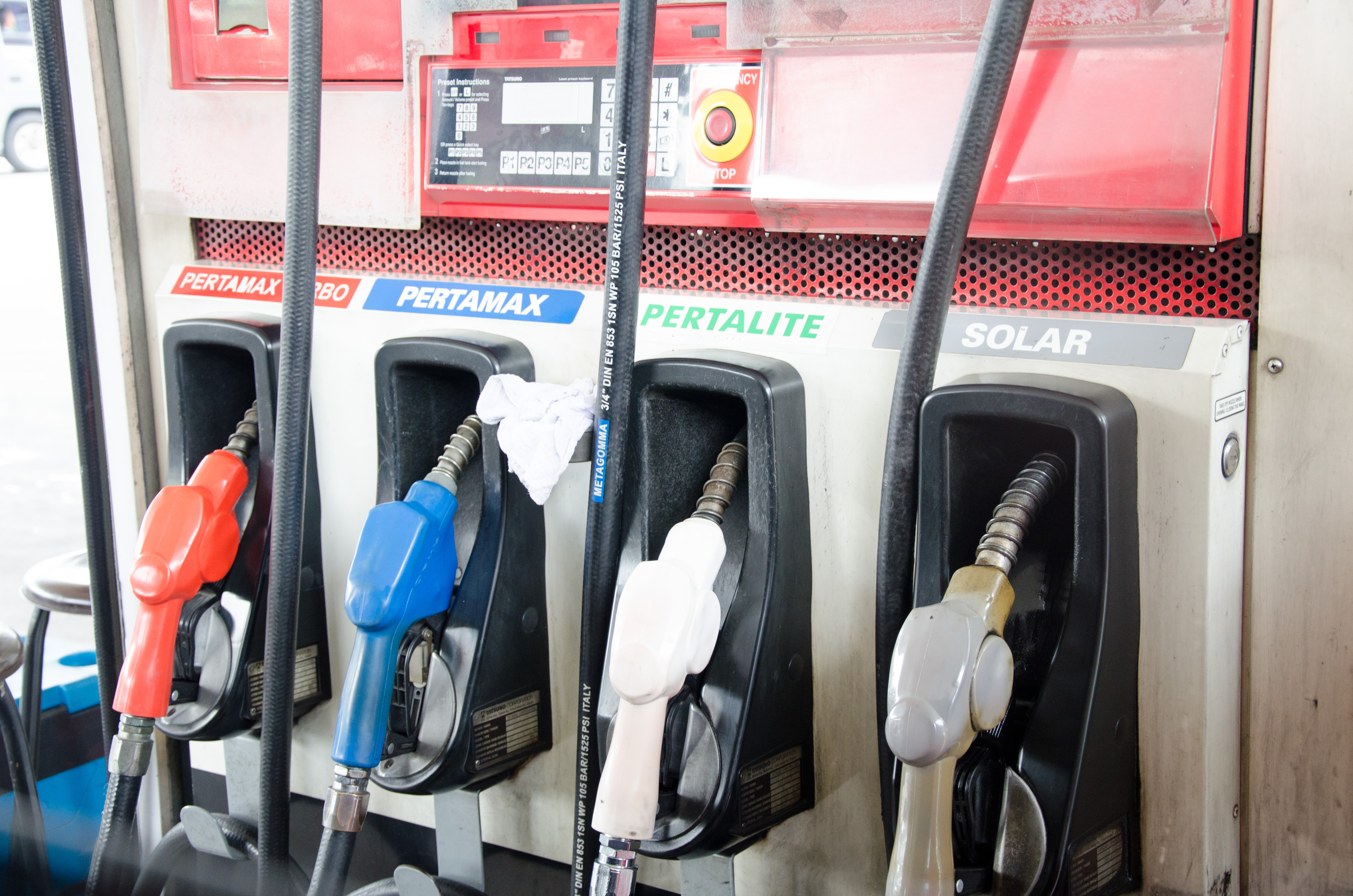
Pertamina products sold in the filling station

Further into the investigation, it was also allegedly found that Pertamina has been selling the subsidized RON 90 Pertalite adulterated with the higher quality RON 92 Pertamax. Heppy Wulansari, Corporate Secretary of Pertamina Patra Niaga denied the accusation and told the media such accusation doesn't have a strong enough proof.

In July 2025, the prosecutor office announced Mohammad Riza Chalid as a suspect to Pertamina corruption scandal. Riza was said to be ignoring the investigation calls 3 times and said to have fled the country for Singapore long before he was announced as suspect. However, Singaporean authorities stated that they found no immigration data regarding Riza arrival. Indonesian immigration authorities later stated that Riza was suspected to be heading to Malaysia on February.

As of July 2025, there are total 18 people who was named suspect by prosecutor office.

=== Investigation ===
After the scandal was made public, the Corruption Eradication Commission decided to call several figures that was once tied to Pertamina for testifying in the investigation.

On 10 March, the former CEO of Pertamina Nicke Widyawati was called to testify as witness on the LNG procurement corruption scandal within Pertamina. Former Commissioner President of Pertamina Basuki Tjahaja Purnama would also be called for testimony. During his testimony, Basuki stated that he was not aware of the total amount of money being lost in the scandal.

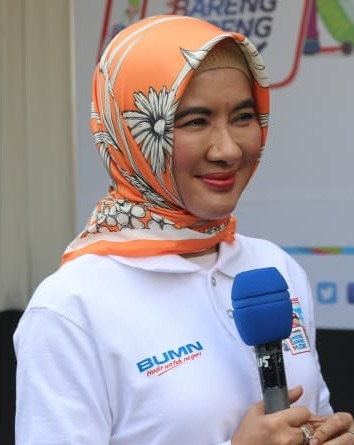
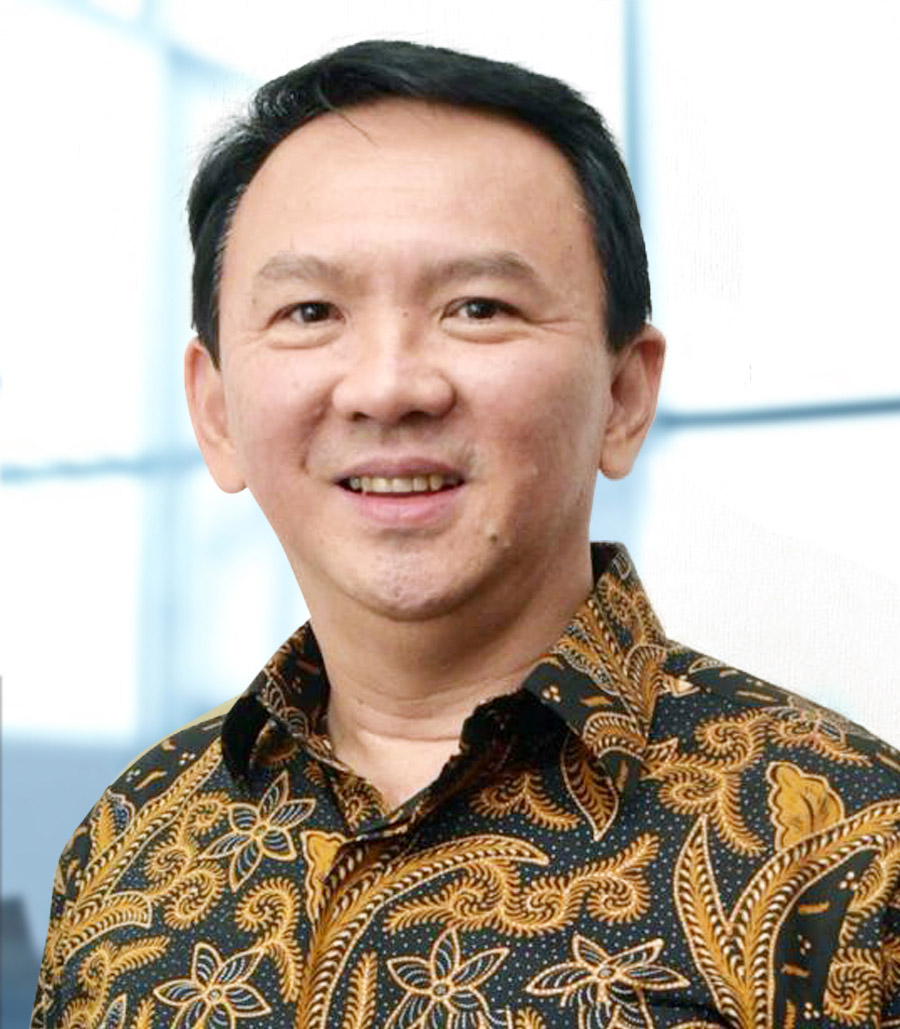
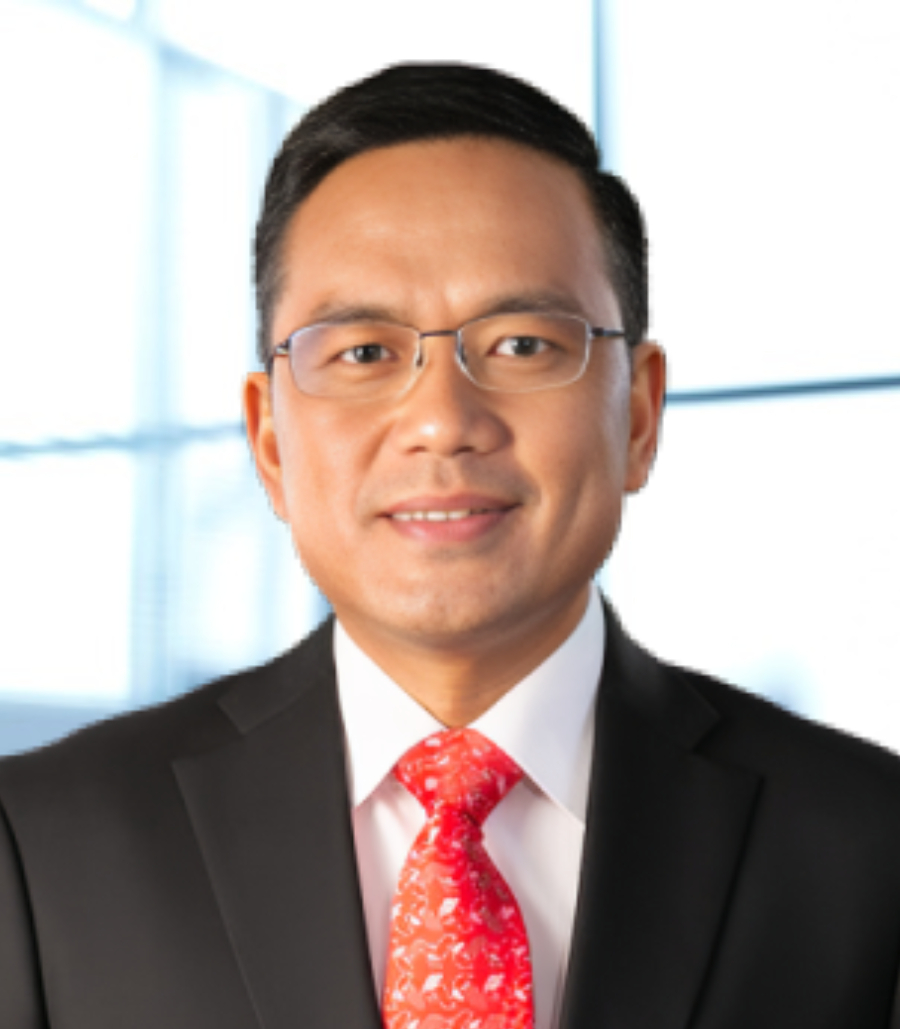
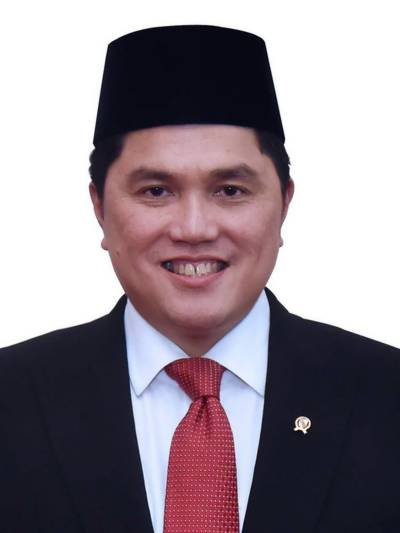
Clockwise from upper left: Nicke Widyawati, former CEO of Pertamina; Basuki Tjahaja Purnama, former President Commissioner of Pertamina; Simon Aloysius Mantiri, current President Director of Pertamina; Erick Thohir, Minister of State Owned Enterprises.

Member of House of Representatives (DPR) Eko Hendro Purnomo planned to summon the Minister of State Owned Enterprise Erick Thohir to testify before the representatives. Erick would appear before the representatives on 5 March in order to testify on the Pertamina case along with evaluating the performances of other state-owned enterprises before the Sixth Commission of the House of Representative.

Later, the Sixth Commission of the House of Representatives called the President Director, Simon Aloysius Mantiri, to testify before the commission. During the testimony, representative Mufti Anam slammed Mantiri for refusing to talk about the adulteration of Pertamax

As of 8 March 2025, the Attorney General's Office have investigated total 8 witnesses. Among those who investigated are staff from Ministry of Energy and Mineral Resources, The Special Working Unit for the Organization of Upstream Oil and Gas Business Activities (SKK Migas), PT Pertamina and its subsidiaries, and Indonesian automotive journalist Fitra Eri.

=== Verdict ===
On 27 February 2026, Riva Siahaan and five other Pertamina executives received jail sentences of 9-10 years. On the same day, verdict hearings which continued for more than 10 hours into the early morning of the next day, announced a 15 years prison sentence for Riza Chalid's son Muhammad Kerry Adrianto Riza, and 14 years for Gading Ramadhan Juedo as well as for Dimas Werhaspati. Prosecutors had previously named Riza Chalid as a suspect in July, but he had already left Indonesia earlier in the year and remains a fugitive. In early March, all of them submitted their appeals.

== Reactions ==
The corruption scandal has caused mixed reactions among the government circle and the public perception toward Pertamina. The scandal has tarnished Pertamina reputation nationwide.

=== Officials ===
During the press conference, The director of Pertamina, Simon Aloysius Mantiri openly made a public apology for the corruption and adulteration of Pertamax. Simon also stated that the corruption case is a harsh blow on Pertamina and appreciate the effort of law enforcement in solving the case and is willing to cooperate with the law if needed.

In a separate press conference, Attorney General ST Burhanuddin assures the public that the current investigation has nothing to do with the adulterated oil issues and urged the public to remain calm. Burhanuddin also urged the public to keep supporting Pertamina claiming that the products sold by Pertamina are safe to use.

=== Public ===
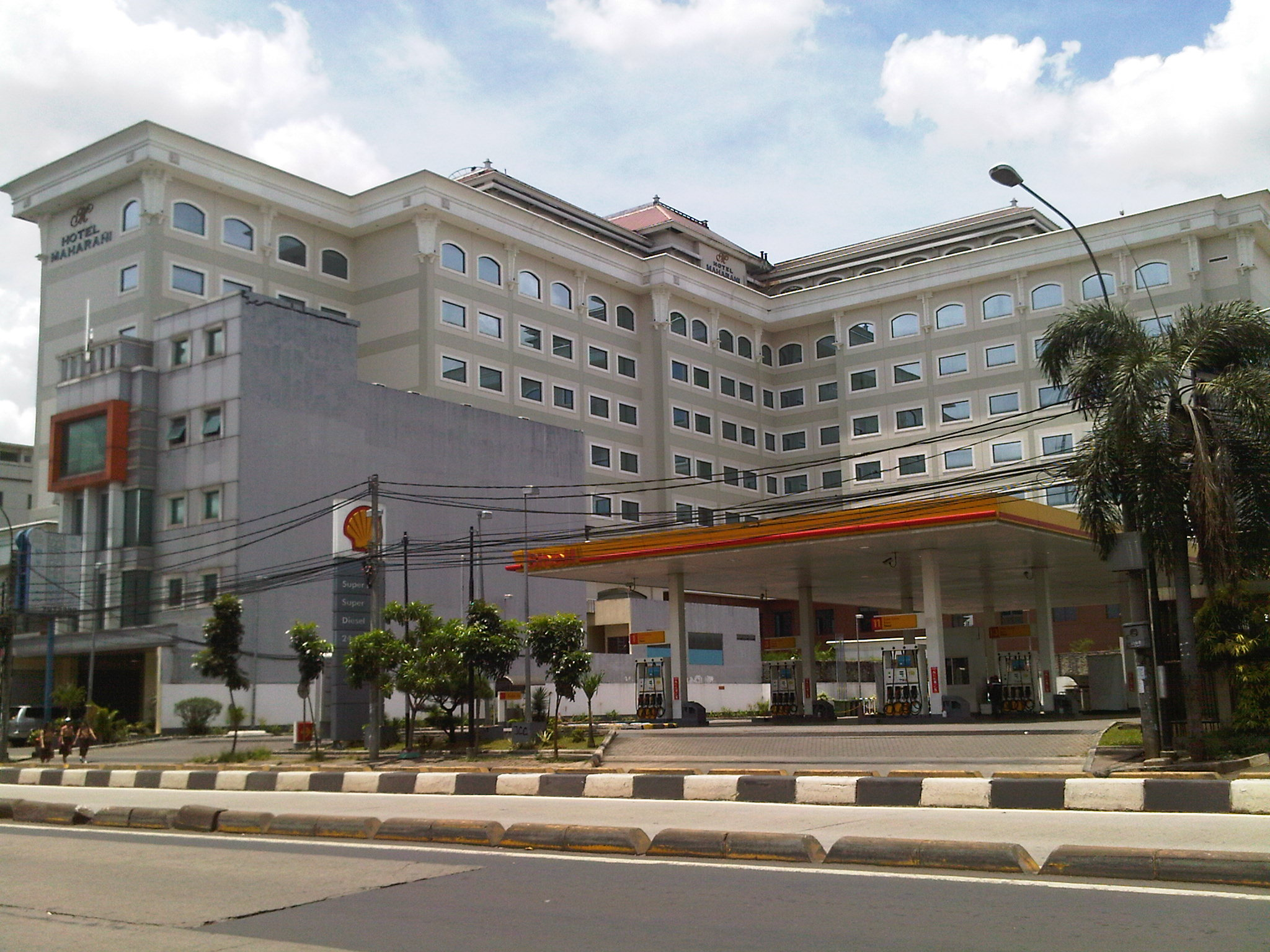
Shell filling station in Jakarta

After the news of the adulteration of Pertamax became public, many people has lost their faith in Pertamina business practices. As the public scrutiny mount, most of Indonesian consumers decided to boycott Pertamina oils and start favouring non-government filling stations such as Shell, BP, and Vivo has become preferable alternative choices among public. According to Universitas Gadjah Mada law professor M. Fatahillah Akbar, consumers have the right to fill a class action lawsuit against Pertamina under criminal and civil rights law.

Universitas Gadjah Mada management and public administration professor Gabriel Lele urged Pertamina to implement structural reforms in order to restore public trust. Gabriel criticized Pertamina for its lack of structural reform, noting that most solutions tend to be short-term and reactionary rather than comprehensive. He also urged the government to relax regulations to allow competitors to enter the Indonesian energy sector market.

On 8 April 2025, the Islamic Students' Movement of Indonesia held a protest at Pertamina office, Samarinda, demanding the corporation to take responsibility of their adulteration scandal.

== See also ==
- Chromebook procurement scandal, another corruption case under ongoing investigation since May 2025
