= Nadiem Makarim =

Founder of Gojek (born 1984)

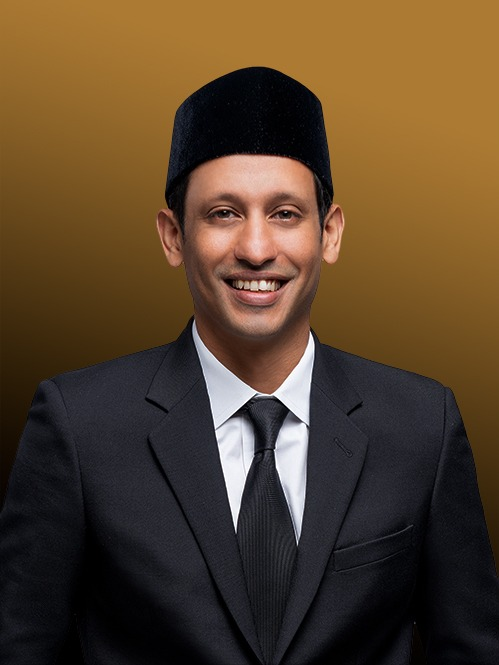
- Official portrait, 2021

1st Minister of Education, Culture, Research, and Technology
- In office 28 April 2021 – 20 October 2024
- President: Joko Widodo
- Preceded by: Himself (as Minister of Education and Culture); Bambang Brodjonegoro (as Minister of Research and Technology)
- Succeeded by: Abdul Mu'ti (as Minister of Primary and Secondary Education); Satryo Brodjonegoro (as Minister of Higher Education, Research, and Technology); Fadli Zon (as Minister of Culture)

29th Minister of Education and Culture
- In office 23 October 2019 – 28 April 2021
- President: Joko Widodo
- Preceded by: Muhadjir Effendy
- Succeeded by: Himself (as Minister of Education, Culture, Research, and Technology)

1st Chief Executive Officer of Gojek
- In office 5 October 2010 – October 2019
- Preceded by: Position established
- Succeeded by: Kevin Aluwi; Andre Soelistyo

Personal details
- Born: Nadiem Anwar Makarim; 4 July 1984 (age 42) Singapore
- Party: Independent
- Spouse: Franka Franklin (m. 2014)
- Relatives: Hamid Algadri (grandfather)
- Education: United World College of Southeast Asia, Singapore
- Alma mater: Brown University (BA); Harvard University (MBA)
- Occupation: Entrepreneur; politician
- Known for: Co-founder of Gojek

Nadiem Anwar Makarim (born 4 July 1984) is an Indonesian politician and businessman who was the minister of education, culture, research, and technology of Indonesia, serving from 2021 until 2024.

Prior to entering politics, in 2010, Makarim founded Gojek, Indonesia's first startup valued at over US$10 billion. In October 2019, he was appointed Minister of Education and Culture by President Joko Widodo on his second term's cabinet and subsequently resigned from his post at Gojek. In 2025, Makarim was arrested in connection with the corruption case Chromebook procurement scandal. In 2026, he was convicted of corruption and sentenced to 10 years in prison; he denied wrongdoing and said he would appeal.

== Early life and education ==
Nadiem Makarim was born in Singapore on 4 July 1984, to Indonesian parents, Nono Anwar Makarim and Atika Algadri. His father is an activist, lawyer and is of mixed Minangkabau-Arab-Indian descent. His maternal grandfather is Hamid Algadri, an Indonesian independence fighter. He has two sisters, Hana Makarim, and filmmaker Rayya Makarim. He married Franka Franklin and they have three children.

Makarim attended high school in Jakarta, and then graduated from the United World College of Southeast Asia (UWC SEA) in Singapore. He attended Brown University for an undergraduate degree in International Relations. He completed his MBA at Harvard Business School.

== Business career ==
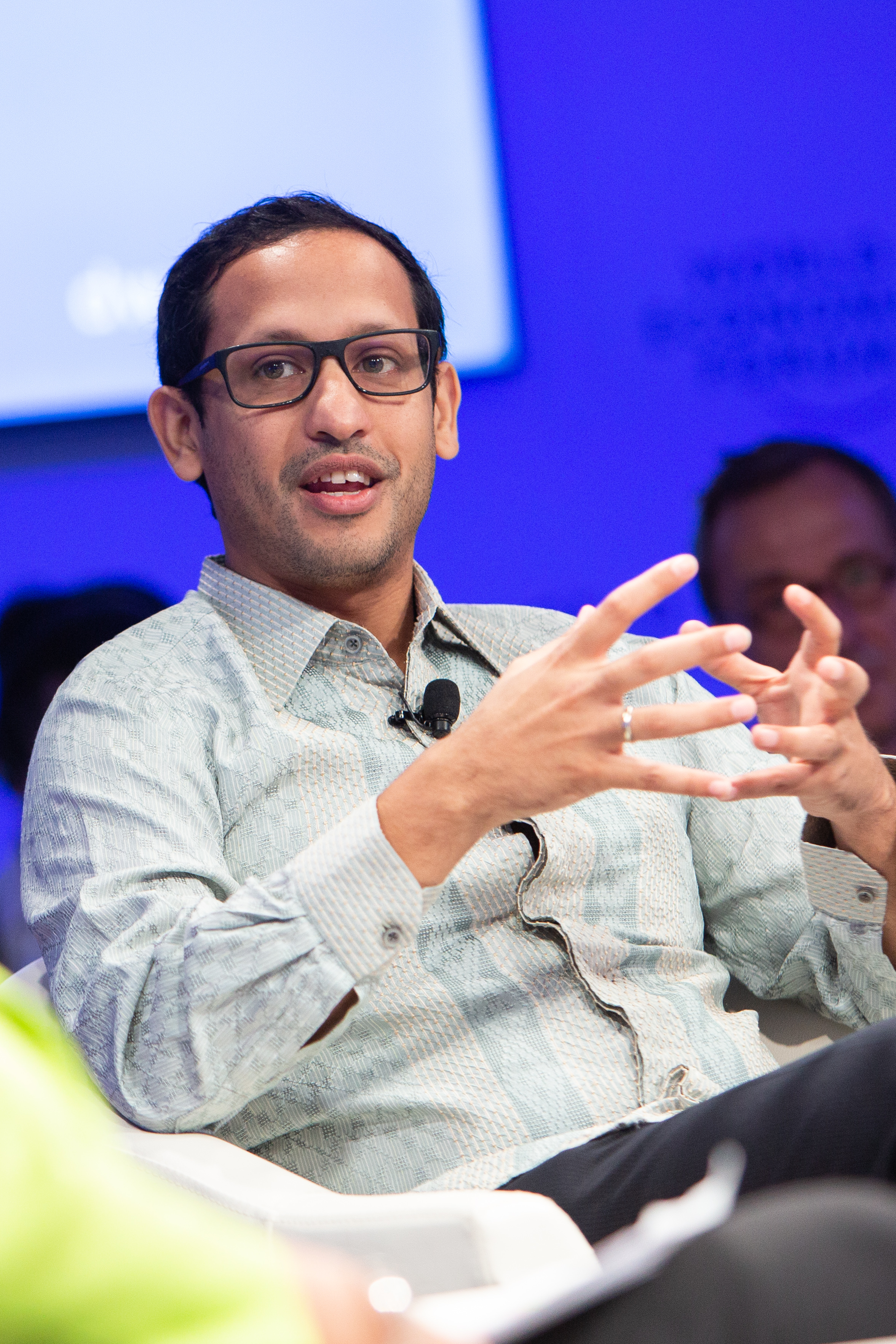
Nadiem Makarim at the World Economic Forum.

=== Early career ===
After graduating from Brown University in 2006, Makarim decided to come back home to Indonesia and worked at McKinsey & Company. Makarim worked as a McKinsey consultant for 3 years.

Makarim started his career at McKinsey & Company as management consultant in Jakarta. He left to co-found Zalora, an online fashion shop, then left Zalora to become Chief Innovation Officer at Kartuku, a payment service provider.

=== Zalora ===
Makarim became co-founder and managing director for Zalora Indonesia in 2011. In 2012, Makarim made the decision to leave Zalora to focus on building his own startup, including Gojek, which at that time had 15 employees and 450 drivers. He claims to have learned enough from Zalora, which was his main goal in accepting the position in the first place. In Zalora, Makarim had the chance to build a mega startup and work with some of the best talents across the region.

=== Kartuku ===
After leaving Zalora and while developing Gojek, Makarim also worked as a chief innovation officer of Kartuku. In the early days, Kartuku didn't have any competition in cashless payment solutions in Indonesia. Kartuku was then acquired by Gojek to strengthen GoPay.

=== Gojek ===
In 2010, Makarim created Gojek, which is today a decacorn company with a valuation of over US$10 billion. Gojek was first established as a call centre, offering only courier delivery and two-wheeled ride-hailing services. Today, Gojek has transformed into a super app, providing more than 20 services, ranging from transportation, food delivery, groceries, massage, house cleaning, logistics to a cashless digital payment platform called GoPay.

Makarim often uses a motorcycle taxi, known in Indonesia as an ojek. He saw this as a business opportunity and developed it into Gojek, which was founded in 2010.

Gojek was well received, and eventually received US$1,3 billion funding from investors, in a 2018-round led by Alphabet Inc's Google, JD.com Inc, and Tencent Holdings. It thereby became the first Indonesian unicorn. By 2019, the firm was worth up to US$10 billion.

On 21 October 2019, Gojek announced that Makarim would leave the company to join president-elect Jokowi's Onward Indonesia Cabinet. His position as CEO was replaced by Gojek group president Andre Soelistyo and Gojek co-founder Kevin Aluwi as co-CEOs. On the second reshuffle of the cabinet, announced at 28 April 2021, he was appointed the first holder of Minister of Education, Culture, Research, and Technology.

=== World Economic Forum ===
He is part of the WEF as a global shaper and has direct control over cultural matters.

== Political career ==
=== Cabinet minister ===
Under Makarim's tenure as Minister of Education and Culture, a decree prohibiting Indonesian schools from enforcing rules mandating the wearing of religious attire was signed into effect on 3 February 2021. Schools were given 30 days to repeal any rules making the wearing of religious attire compulsory before they would face sanctions. Makarim supported the ban, stating that whether a person should wear religious clothing is "an individual's right… it is not the school's decision."

“I joined this government at the request of President Jokowi, leaving behind a career I had spent years building,” he said. “I did it because I believed I could make a difference for Indonesian children and for the future of education in this country.”

== Corruption case ==
On 4 September 2025, Makarim was arrested after being named by the Attorney General's Office of Indonesia as a new suspect in the alleged corruption case involving the government procurement of Chromebook laptops.

In May 2025, the Attorney General's Office of the Republic of Indonesia opened an investigation into alleged corruption related to the procurement program for educational digitalization devices, including Chromebook laptops, at the Ministry of Education, Culture, Research, and Technology for the 2019–2023 period with a budget of nearly IDR 10 trillion. According to him, the policy of using Chrome OS-based devices in this project came from Makarim's orders.

Makarim himself was summoned as a witness several times. He underwent questioning on June 23, 2025, July 15, 2025, and September 4, 2025, at the Deputy Attorney General's Office for Special Crimes in South Jakarta. He explained that the procurement was in accordance with the principle of transparency, and added that the program targets schools with internet access, differing from the previous administration's administration, which targeted 3T (Disadvantaged, Frontier, and Outermost) regions.

On September 4, 2025, the Attorney General's Office officially named Makarim a suspect with the initials NAM. Head of the Attorney General's Office's Legal Information Center, Anang Supriatna, stated that the determination of the suspect was made based on an in-depth examination of witness statements and evidence obtained by investigators.

On September 23, 2025, through his legal team, Makarim filed a pretrial motion challenging his suspect status. According to him, Makarim's suspect status was not supported by two valid pieces of evidence, as one of the alleged state losses in question was based on an audit by the authorized agency, namely the Financial and Development Supervisory Agency or the Supreme Audit Agency of the Republic of Indonesia. Based on this, Makarim's legal team also stated that Makarim's detention status was also invalid.

On 30 June 2026, Makarim was convicted of corruption by an Indonesian court in connection with a school laptop procurement programme introduced during the COVID-19 pandemic while he was serving as minister of education. The court sentenced him to 10 years in prison, fined him 1 billion rupiah, and ordered him to pay 809.6 billion rupiah in restitution. The court also ruled that he would face an additional five-year prison term if he failed to pay the restitution. Makarim denied wrongdoing during the case, which was widely covered in Indonesia and abroad.

== Awards ==
- In 2016, Makarim received The Straits Times Asian of the Year award and was the first Indonesian to receive the award since it was first established in 2012.
- In 2018, Makarim made it to Bloomberg 50 annual list of innovators. Bloomberg wrote that there was no other technology platform (app) that changed the lives of Indonesian as fast and as integrated as Gojek.
- In May 2019, Makarim was the youngest figure from Asia to receive the 24th Nikkei Asia Prize for economic and business innovation. Makarim doubled the prize to Rp860 million and donated the amount as education scholarship for Gojek drivers’ children. Gojek contributed Rp 55 trillion (US$3.85 Billion) towards the Indonesian economy, with the average income of GoRide and GoCar partners increasing by 45% and 42% after joining Gojek, and culinary SMEs transaction volume increasing 55% after becoming GoFood merchant.
- In 2017, Gojek made it to Fortune's Top 50 Companies That Changed The World, ranking 17th worldwide. In 2019 Gojek once again made it to Fortune's Top 50 Companies That Changed The World, and was the only Southeast Asian company to have been included twice in the list - this year leaping to number 11 out of 52 global companies.
- In November 2019, Makarim was the only Indonesian to be included on 100 Next list for Leaders category by the Time magazine. Time's 100 Next list this year is to recognize the influence of rising stars who are shaping the future in their respective fields.

== International organizations ==
With Melinda Gates and the Minister of Finance of Indonesia, Sri Mulyani, Makarim served as one of the commissioners of Pathways for Prosperity for Technology and Inclusive Development that focuses on helping developing countries to adapt to various new digital innovations that change the working culture.

Business positions
Preceded by Position established	Chief Executive Officer of Gojek; 2010–2019	Succeeded by Kevin Aluwi and Andre Soelistyo
Political offices
Preceded by Muhadjir Effendy	Minister of Education and Culture; 2019–2021	Succeeded by Himself as Minister of Education, Culture, Research, and Technology
Preceded by Himself as Minister of Education and Culture	Minister of Education, Culture, Research, and Technology; 2021–2024	Succeeded by Abdul Mu'ti as Minister of Primary and Secondary Education
Preceded by Himself as Minister of Education and Culture	Minister of Education, Culture, Research, and Technology; 2021–2024	Succeeded by Fadli Zon as Minister of Culture
Preceded by Bambang Brodjonegoro as Minister of Research and Technology	Minister of Education, Culture, Research, and Technology; 2021–2024	Succeeded by Satryo Brodjonegoro as Minister of Higher Education, Science, and Technology
