= Gojek =

Indonesian platform and technology group

PT Gojek Indonesia
- Gojek's current logo, nicknamed as "Solv", used since 13 December 2022
- Type: Subsidiary
- Industry: Technology
- Founded: 5 October 2010; 16 years ago
- Founders: Nadiem Makarim; Kevin Aluwi; Michaelangelo Moran
- Headquarters: Jakarta, Indonesia
- Area served: Indonesia; Thailand; Singapore; Philippines; India; Australia
- Key people: Hans Patuwo (CEO and GoTo Group CEO); Shobit Singhal (Chief Transport Officer); Catherine Hindra Sutjahyo (Head of Food and Indonesia Sales & Ops); Severan Rault (Group CTO); David Fitzgerald (Chief Financial Officer)
- Number of employees: 3,000 (2019)
- Parent: GoTo (2021–present)
- Website: www.gojek.com
- Footnotes: Area served

PT Gojek Indonesia (stylized in all lower case and stylized j as goȷek, formerly styled as GO-JEK) is an Indonesian on-demand multi-service platform and digital payment technology group based in Jakarta. Gojek was first established in Indonesia in 2009 as a call center to connect consumers to courier delivery and two-wheeled ride-hailing services. Gojek launched its application in 2015 with only four services: GoRide, GoSend, GoShop, and GoFood. Valued at US$10 billion today, Gojek has transformed into a super app, providing more than 20 services.

Gojek operates in 4 countries: Indonesia, Singapore, Thailand, and the Philippines (through the acquisition of Coins.ph). Gojek is the first Indonesian unicorn company as well as the country's first "decacorn" company. It is the only company in Southeast Asia that is included in Fortune's "50 Companies That Changed the World" in 2017 and 2019, ranked at 17 and 11, respectively. As of June 2020, it has about 170 million users throughout Southeast Asia.

On 17 May 2021, Gojek and Tokopedia announced the completion of their merger and established a new holding company, called GoTo.

Gojek has won financial backing from investors including Astra International, Blibli, Google, Facebook, PayPal, Mitsubishi, Sequoia, Northstar Group, Temasek Holdings, KKR, Warburg Pincus, Visa, Parallon, Siam Commercial Bank, Tencent, JD.com, meituan.com, and Capital Group, among others.

== History ==
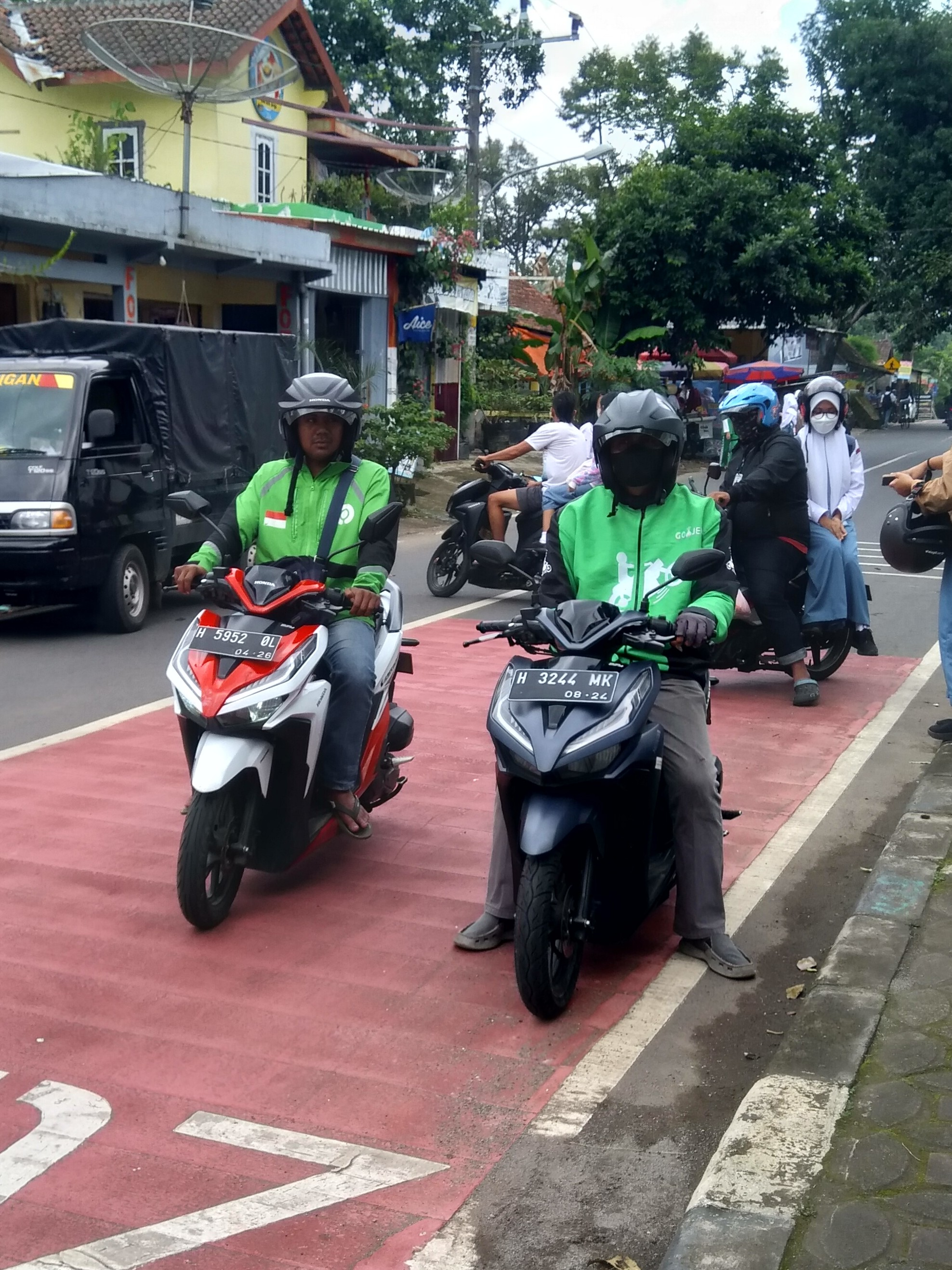
Gojek motorcycle riders in Salatiga, Central Java, Indonesia

The name Gojek comes from the term “Ojek” or motorbike taxis commonly found throughout Indonesia. It was founded in 2010 with 20 motorbike drivers. Gojek app was launched in January 2015, and in less than two years, the app racked up nearly 30 million downloads. Gojek has partnered with Singapore's biggest bank DBS.

Gojek was co-founded by Nadiem Makarim and Michaelangelo Moran. Nadiem, a native Indonesian, holds degrees from Brown University and Harvard Business School. He worked at McKinsey and Co. consulting for three years before starting Gojek from a tiny call centre with only 20 ojek drivers, who later became recruiters. As a loyal ojek user, Nadiem discovered that ojek drivers spend most of their times waiting for customers, while customers waste time walking around looking for an available ojek. Gojek was built to solve this problem, by providing a platform where drivers and riders can connect efficiently and allowing those drivers to improve their income. The other co-founder and long time high school friend, Michaelangelo Moran, aside from serving as the company's Brand Director, is also known for designing the company's first iconic logo and branding the whole company.

As of May 2018, the app offers 18 services, with 2 upcoming new services in the online content business, which makes for a total of 20 on-demand services under one platform. Being an Indonesian-run startup played to Gojek's advantage in navigating the local regulatory environment, as well as understanding the local market. This enabled them to bundle features into its app that better suit both local drivers and local consumers. Gojek recruited 100 new graduates in engineering domain from India in 2017.

In 2020, the company launched GoStore, a solution that helps local micro, small, and medium-sized enterprises (MSMEs) set up online stores with ease.

=== Financing ===
Gojek's journey in becoming a unicorn startup started in late-2014 when it secured its first financing round from NSI Ventures (now Openspace Ventures), the venture capital fund in the Northstar Group. Due to rapid growth in early 2015, Gojek attracted additional investments from Sequoia India and Northstar's private equity fund.

After closing a round of funding in August 2016 that raised up to $550 million, two of Indonesia's biggest companies, Astra International, and Blibli.com, invested in Gojek. International investors include tech giants such as American firm Google and Chinese Tencent, along with the global investment company Temasek. A survey revealed Gojek as the most popular ride-hailing app in Indonesia. The company is valued at about $5 billion as of February 2018, which exceeds the total market cap of all transportation companies in Indonesia Stock Exchange (IDX).

In May 2018, it was announced that Gojek is investing $500 million towards its international expansion strategy. In January 2019, the startup closed another round of financing for $2 billion. The total valuation of the company reached $9.5 billion.

In March 2020, Gojek announced it has received $1.2 Billion in funding for its Series F round. The valuation it was seeking for was U$10 Billion USD.

In June 2020, Facebook's messaging platform WhatsApp and PayPal announced they had invested in Gojek as part of the ongoing fundraising round. The size and nature of the investments were not disclosed, but they were described as "meaningful".

=== Acquisitions and merger ===
The company's rapid growth triggered a chain of acquisitions and partnerships. In 2016, Gojek announced acquisition of two engineering startups based in India, C42 Engineering and CodeIgnition, and established a development centre in Bangalore, India. They also acquired Leftshift, an Indian mobile application developer, and Pianta, an Indian home healthcare startup.

In 2017, Gojek acquired Loket.com, one of Indonesia's biggest online ticket booking and event management system company. In the same year, it acquired three large network fintech firm in Indonesia; Kartuku, Midtrans, and Mapan, in order to expand its payments business.

In January 2019, Gojek acquired a majority stake in mobile wallet Coins.ph. Gojek later sold its stake in Coins.ph in 2022 to Joffre Capital and former Binance chief financial officer Wei Zhou.

In June 2019, Gojek acquired AirCTO, an AI recruiting platform based in Bangalore, India.

In March 2020, Gojek acquired Moka, a SaaS Point of Sales provider in Indonesia. The talks had been in discussion since 2019 and finalized in March 2020.

In December 2020, Gojek was reportedly in talks with Grab to combine their businesses in what would be the biggest Internet merger in southeast Asia.

In February 2021, Gojek was reported to be close to a merger with Tokopedia, shortly before publicly listing in the U.S. and Indonesian stock markets.

On 17 May 2021, Tokopedia and Gojek confirmed a merger with the establishment of a new entity, GoTo. The establishment of GoTo would make it one of Southeast Asia's largest technology conglomerates. GoTo's gross transaction volume (GTV) was over $22 billion in 2020, across more than 1.8 billion transactions.

In July 2021, AirAsia announced that the company will be acquiring Gojek's business in Thailand via an all-stock deal. Upon the acquisition, Gojek will hold a 4.76% stake in AirAsia's superapp business.

=== Partnerships ===
In 2016, it announced a collaboration with Blue Bird, a major Indonesian taxi company. The same year it launched Go-Car, expanding ride-hailing from motorbike fleet to cars, and launched Go-Auto, providing on-demand mechanic services. By August 2016, it had become Indonesia's first online transportation system.

In running their GPS, it partnered with Google Maps. Other partnerships include entertainment; Google Play and MNC Vision. Bill Payment; AEON Credit Service & Suzuki Finance Indonesia. And the national electricity provider PLN, as well as the national health insurance BPJS Kesehatan.

In February 2019, Garuda Indonesia CEO Ari Ashkara told Reuters that Garuda is in advanced discussions with Gojek for the delivery of products sold on Gojek across 17,000 Indonesian Islands.

In August 2019, the Wall Street Journal reported that Gojek had held "preliminary talks" with Amazon on a partnership that would involve the retail giant making a sizable investment in Gojek to tap into the company's delivery infrastructure in order to expand Amazon's market reach in Indonesia.

In September 2020, Gojek announced a partnership with Unilever. As part of this collaboration, Gojek partners with Unilever through the recently launched GoToko. GoToko is a B2B digital platform that connects micro, small and medium enterprises (MSMEs) in Indonesia with leading consumer goods companies. This cooperation allows MSME players to use GoToko to access a complete range of daily necessities products from various brands, including Unilever, at competitive prices and affordable shipping costs.

=== Impact ===
As per Temasek Digital's YouTube channel, Gojek has contributed an estimated Rp 9.9 trillion (US$732 million) annually to the Indonesian economy.

Another research article reported that Gojek contributed Rp 8.2 trillion annually into the Indonesian economy through the income of driver partners, an additional Rp 138.6 billion per month are contributed into national economy since SME merchant partners join Go-Food, and Rp 1.7 trillion into Indonesian economy through the income of SME merchant partners.

=== Rebranding ===
Gojek's second logo, nicknamed as "Solv", used from 27 July 2019 until 13 December 2022

On 22 July 2019, Gojek unveiled a new logo. Its new icon, which nicknamed as "Solv", symbolized Gojek's transformation from being a ride-hailing service to become a super app that provides a variety of smart ways to eliminate hassles.

=== Shutdown of services ===
In December 2019, due to stagnant growth, Gojek announced plan to discontinue most of its lifestyle services operating under its Golife brand. GoLaundry and GoDaily services discontinued on 31 December 2019, while GoFix, GoGlam and Service Marketplace services discontinued by mid-January 2020. Gojek still retained GoClean and GoMassage by that time where 90% of lifestyle services order come from. Due to effect of the COVID-19 pandemic on its business, Gojek further discontinued all of its lifestyle services that was still left, namely GoClean and GoMassage, on 27 July 2020. Gojek also discontinued GoFood Festival around the same time period.

== Gojek centres ==
Gojek operates in many large and medium-size Indonesian cities, and also in rural areas within Indonesia;

Gojek launched its ride-hailing service in Singapore on 10 January 2019 as part of "an enhancement of its beta phase". Its president, Andre Soelistyo, said that it is committed to "bringing choice back to the ride-hailing market in Singapore". In February 2019, Gojek Singapore appointed management consultant and mountain climber Lien Choong Luen as the GM of its Singapore operations.

=== International ===
Gojek has an office in Singapore, with data science and engineering capabilities, and Bangalore, India, which was created with the acquisitions of C42 and CodeIgnition, and focuses on product, engineering and design.

In May 2018, Gojek announced investing $500 million in its international expansion strategy to Vietnam, Thailand, Singapore and the Philippines, starting with ride-hailing, then further replicating the multiple-service business model in Indonesia. These companies will be run by local founding teams, with Gojek providing technological support and expertise.

== Products ==
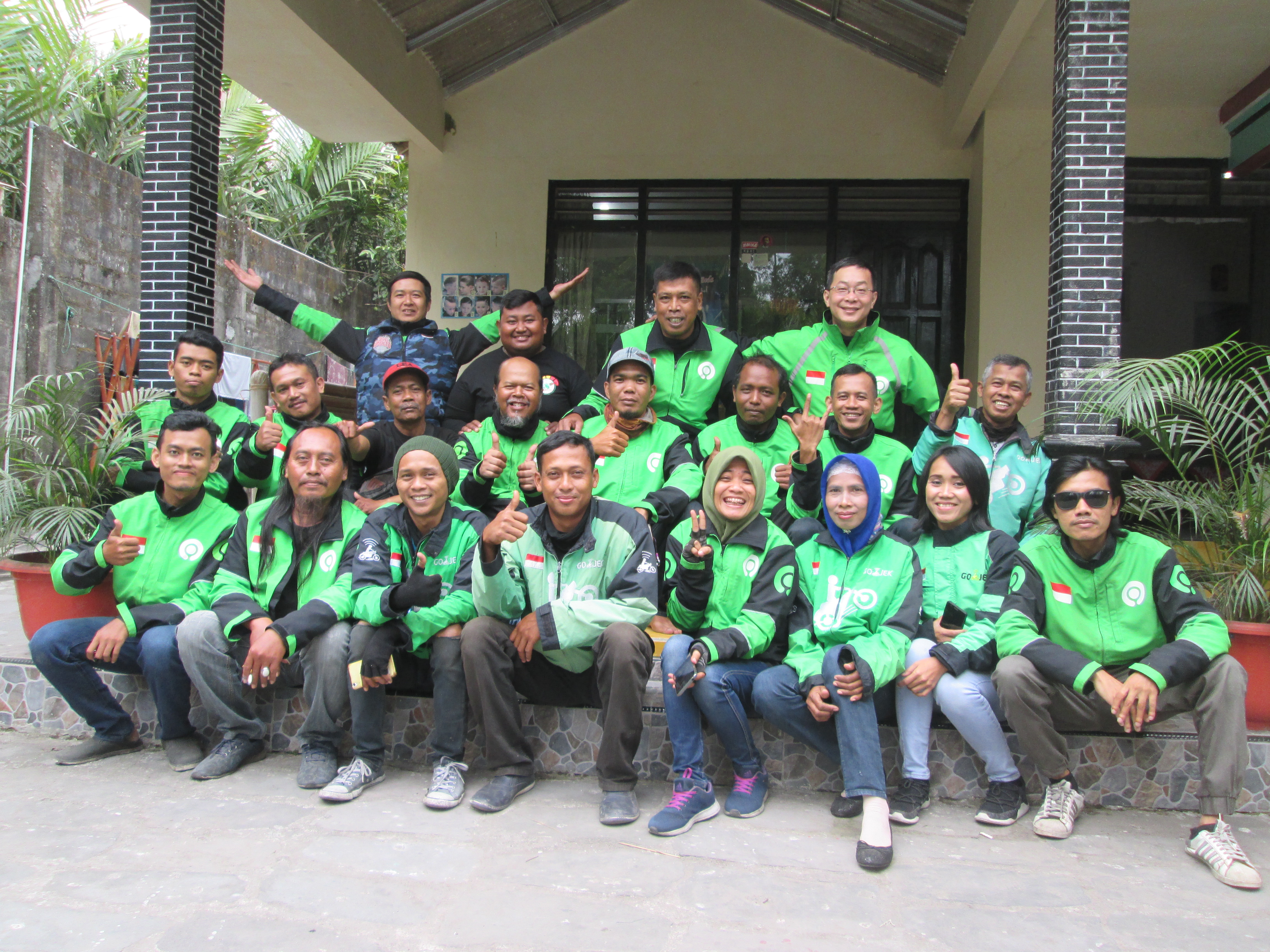
Gojek drivers in uniform

- Go-Pay is Indonesia's fourth biggest e-wallet service, behind the country's largest lenders; Bank Mandiri’s e-Money, Bank Central Asia’s Flazz, and telecom firm Telkomsel’s T-Cash. In October 2017 Go-Pay transactions constituted 30 percent of overall e-money transactions in Indonesia. In the same year, the service was awarded the most proactive Fintech company to support the National Cashless Movement by the central bank. In May 2017, the service acquired a license from the central bank to use QR code payment.
- GoRide, the first online motorcycle taxi service in Indonesia. As of May 2018, Gojek has more than 1,000,000 fleets.
- Go-Car, a ride-hailing service for cars.
- Go-Blue Bird enables customers to request Blue Bird taxis in the app. Unlike fixed fare that Go-Car charges, it is a metered taxi service.
- GoFood, an instant food delivery service with more than 250,000 merchants all over Indonesia.
- Go-Food Festival is an offline food-court chain concept from Go-Food, which sells food and beverage from Go-Food merchants. It has opened in major cities in Indonesia such as Surabaya, Makassar, and Palembang and with more than 15 stores across the country, has become the most well networked food-court chain concept in Indonesia.
- Go-Mart offers app-based grocery shopping at supermarket listed in the Gojek app.
- Go-Shop, similar to Go-Mart, it allows customers to purchase goods from shops that are not listed in Go-Mart.
- Go-Send is an on-demand courier service to send items and documents with no limits on distance within one delivery zone.
- Go-Box is similar to Go-Send, for moving large items using pickup trucks, single-axle trucks, and single-axle box trucks.
- Go-Tix is an app-based entertainment ticket selling service.
- Go-Med, an app-based medicine delivery service, partnering with HaloDoc on its “Apotik Antar” feature.
- Go-Massage enables customers to request a personal masseuse.
- Go-Clean, an app-based professional house cleaning service.
- Go-Glam, an app-based personal hairstylist, nail care, waxing and facial service.
- Go-Auto, an app-based auto care for maintenance, including car washing, as well as emergency repair.
- Go-Pulsa, an app-based phone credit top-up service. Go-Pulsa can only be paid by Go-Pay.
- Go-Bills is a service to pay PLN electricity bills, purchase PLN electricity tokens, and pay BPJS insurance premiums.
- Go-Points is a loyalty program from Gojek. Users receive a token for each transaction and can redeem with rewards through the app.
- Go-Play & Go-Studio: The company announced plans to venture into online content business with Go-Play as a video streaming provider, and Go-Studio as their production house. GoPlay officially launch their service in September 2019.
- Go-Pertamina – an on-demand fuel-delivery service in partnership with Indonesia's oil major Pertamina, brings fuel to users from the nearest Pertamina gas station.
- Go-Nearby a directory service connecting Go-Food merchant with Go-Jek's customers.
- GoRide and GoCar Protect+: The company announced a plan to add new services which offers better security to the users.

== Awards and recognition ==
Gojek ranks number 17 in Fortune's 2017 list of "56 Companies that Changed the World," making it the only company from South East Asia to make the list. In 2019 Gojek once again made it to Fortune's Top 50 Companies That Changed The World, and was the only Southeast Asian company to have been included twice in the list – leaping to number 11 out of 52 global companies. Other international recognition includes Top Performer in ASEAN Award 2017, Entrepreneur of The Year award from Ernst & Young, and Superior Products and Services Awards 2016.

National recognition includes The BrandZ Top 15 Most Valuable Indonesian Brands 2019, Top 3 Brand Performer and Top 3 Most Powerful Transportation/Logistic brands, Top 3 Netizen Choice in Online Transportation, The Best Indonesia Mobile App 2015, Best Startup Category Work Life Balance, Indonesia's Most Admired CEO 2017, and Most Creative in Solving Economic Challenges 2017.

== Sponsorships ==
Gojek sponsored the Liga 1 from 2017 to 2018 (in 2017 with Traveloka). Gojek also sponsored Persib Bandung from 2019. Gojek is also one of the local sponsors of the 2023 FIBA Basketball World Cup, which was co-hosted by Indonesia.

== Work culture ==
=== Employees ===
Gojek has more than 3,000 employees, including 210 engineers in its three Jakarta-based headquarters, a data science office in Singapore, and an engineering facility in India. The company announced $500 million investment to expand in South East Asia, starting with ride-hailing service in 4 new countries mid-2018. This expansion will add to their number of existing partners, which as of May 2018 includes a fleet of over 1,000,000 drivers, 125,000 merchants for Go-FOOD, and 30,000 professionals for their Go-MASSAGE, Go-GLAM, Go-CLEAN and Go-AUTO service.

Due to the pandemic, Gojek had to lay off 430 employees in June 2020.

=== Workplace ===
The Gojek headquarters in Jakarta revamped an old mall into a modern working space with a cinema, a playroom with arcade games and pool tables, as well as office cafes and nap rooms.

== Criticism and controversy ==
Gojek's rapid growth and market dominance in Indonesia have led to prominent media coverage, including criticism primarily stemming from conventional taxi and Ojek services. Gojek was briefly banned from operations by the Ministry of Transportation, along with other ride-hailing services. The ban was opposed by a huge number of Indonesians, mustering public support with the hashtag #SaveGojek that became a top trending topic on Twitter in Indonesia. The ban was lifted the very same day after then-President Joko Widodo criticized it, stating the government should not prohibit innovation and asserting the ban would adversely affect the lives of many Indonesians who rely on Gojek's services. In October 2018, the Indonesian Minister of Transportation, Budi Karya Sumadi, applied a new rule for online taxis. PM 108 replaced the previous PM 26, regulating the use of private cars being used for public transportation.

In March 2018, only weeks after the firm raised a new round of capital, thousands of drivers showed up on foot along the road across the Presidential palace in a demonstration against the tariff, which was roughly 1600 rupiah (15 cents) per kilometer then. The demand was continued in a future protest in January 2020, where the drivers demanded action from the Ministry of Transportation who had promised to evaluate the tariffs that were set by these firms. Drivers felt that these tariffs should be handled on a provincial level as each provincial government has the autonomy to set its own minimum wages. One of the earliest demonstrations by Gojek drivers was back in 2015 when they protested in front of Gojek's first headquarter in Kemang, Jakarta, insisting that they meet Nadiem Makarim, co-founder and then-CEO, demanding for transparency in the incentive scheme. Drivers felt it was unfair that their pay was slashed for an inventory deposit they were not aware of such as the Gojek driver jacket that was initially lent to them on a rental mechanism but was eventually being billed to them.

Since its inception, Gojek has seen a number of large-scale demonstrations by its drivers. In June 2021, just a few days before the official merger of Gojek and Tokopedia, Gojek drivers announced that they were going on a three-day strike due to a change in GoKilat's (Gojek's courier service vertical) incentive scheme, resulting in significantly reduced tariff for the drivers. As part of the resistance, the drivers planned not to accept any GoKilat orders in Greater Jakarta and Bandung. A protest occurred again in August 2024, during which the drivers demonstrated for humane working conditions, decent wages, and the recognition of their legal status. They called on the government and online transportation companies to legalize the status of the driver profession within the law. Additionally, they requested that the application company reduce the percentage of their earnings that it retains. They went on strike on 29 August by making their services unavailable the whole day, and stormed Gojek, Grab, and the Ministry of Communication and Information offices. Gojek responded by ensuring that the public can still use their application services despite the demonstration by drivers on Thursday. It is also open to listening to the aspirations of the company's partners. However, Gojek did not provide an explanation regarding the income formula for the drivers.

== See also ==
- Grab
- List of unicorn startup companies
