= Ministry of Primary and Secondary Education =

Government ministry of Indonesia

- Kementerian Pendidikan Dasar dan Menengah
- As Indonesian education icon, the ministry shares the same emblem as the Ministry of Higher Education, Science, and Technology

- Flag of the Ministry of Primary and Secondary Education

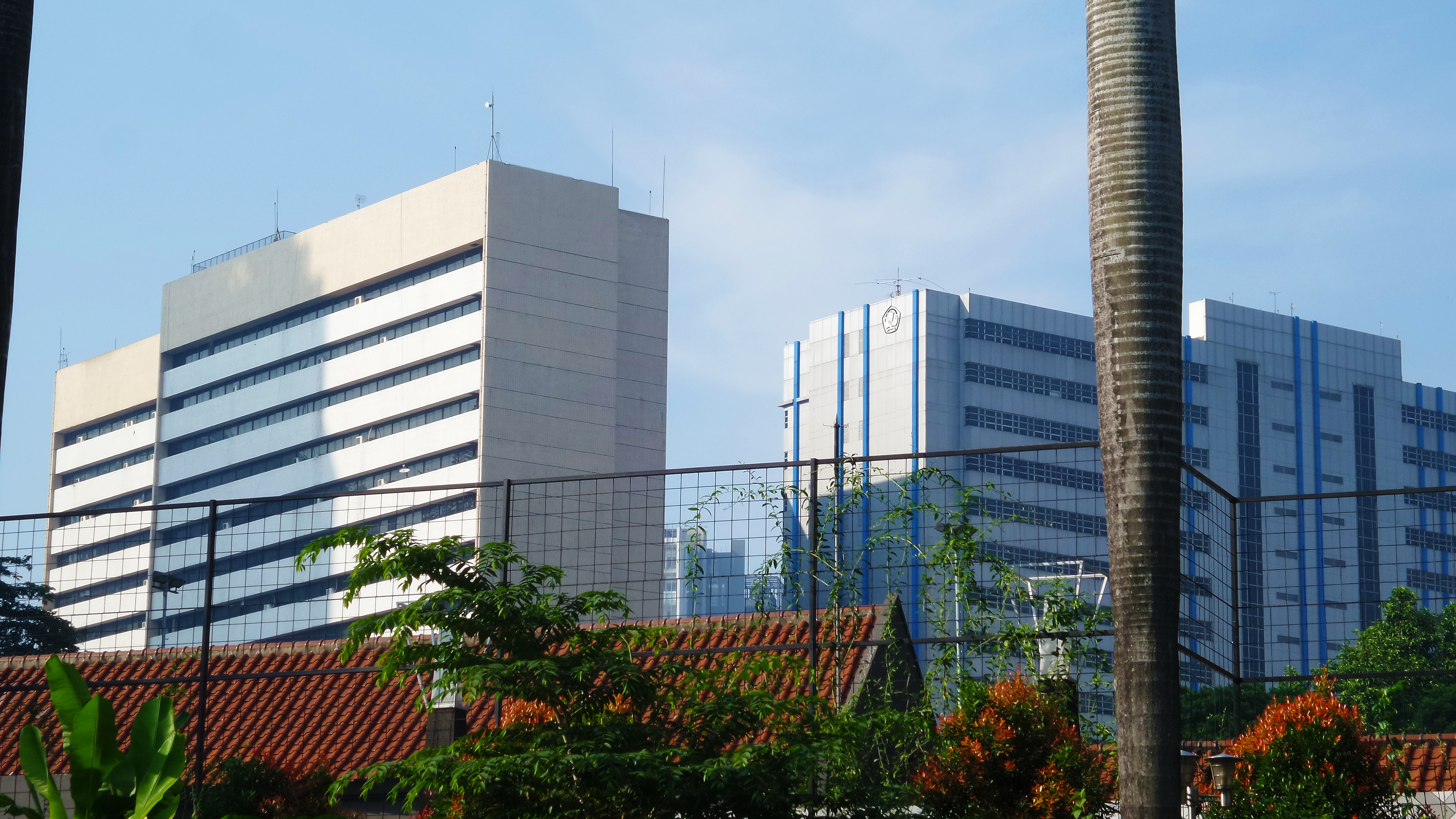
- Ministry of Primary and Secondary Education headquarters

Ministry overview
- Formed: 19 August 1945; 81 years ago as Department of Teaching; 21 October 2024; 23 months ago as its current form
- Preceding Ministry: Ministry of Education, Culture, Research, and Technology
- Jurisdiction: Government of Indonesia
- Headquarters: Jl. Jend. Sudirman, Senayan, Jakarta, Indonesia, 10270; 6.225836330559913°S 106.80235757253318°E
- Motto: Tut Wuri Handayani (Javanese, from Ki Hajar Dewantara's maxim) ("Encouraging from the rear")
- Annual budget: Rp33.54 trillion (2025); Rp8.03 trillion (Efficiency); Rp25.51 trillion (2025 State Budget)
- Minister responsible: Abdul Mu'ti, Minister of Primary and Secondary Education
- Deputy Ministers responsible: Atip Latipulhayat, First Deputy Minister of Primary and Secondary Education; Fajar Riza Ul Haq, Second Deputy Minister of Primary and Secondary Education
- Child Ministry: Language Development and Fostering Agency
- Website: www.kemendikdasmen.go.id

The Ministry of Primary and Secondary Education (Indonesian: Kementerian Pendidikan Dasar dan Menengah, abbreviated as Kemendikdasmen) is an Indonesian ministry that organizes the government sub-divisions of primary education and secondary education which are within the scope of government affairs in the field of education. This ministry is under and responsible to the President of Indonesia, and is led by Abdul Mu'ti.

== History ==
After Prabowo Subianto was inaugurated as a President of Indonesia, under the Red White Cabinet, the Ministry of Education, Culture, Research, and Technology was split into three ministries, there are: Ministry of Primary and Secondary Education, Ministry of Higher Education, Science and Technology, and Ministry of Cultural Affairs.

== Duties and functions ==
The Ministry of Elementary and Secondary Education has the task of organizing the sub-district government of elementary and secondary education which is the scope of government affairs in the field of education to assist the President in organizing the government of the country. The Ministry of Elementary and Secondary Education carries out the following functions:

1. formulation and determination of policies in the field of teachers, other educators, and education personnel, as well as teacher professional education, and early childhood education, basic education, secondary education, vocational education, special education, and special service education. However, there is exception for schools under SMA Unggul Garuda (Garuda Superior High School) Initiative, which are placed under Directorate General of Science and Technology, Ministry of Higher Education, Science and Technology domain per Presidential Decree No. 7/2026;
2. implementation of policies in the field of teachers, other educators, and education personnel, transfer of educators and education personnel across provinces, and facilitation of teacher professional education;
3. implementation of facilitation of teachers, other educators, and education personnel and the implementation of early childhood education, basic education, secondary education, vocational education, special education, and special service education;
4. preparation of standards, curriculum, and assessment in the field of early childhood education, basic education, secondary education, vocational education, special education, and special service education;
5. determination of national education standards and national curriculum for early childhood education, basic education, secondary education, vocational education, special education, and special service education;
6. implementation of development, guidance, and protection of language and literature;
7. implementation of book system management;
8. implementation of technical guidance and supervision over the implementation of Ministry affairs in the regions;
9. coordination of the implementation of tasks, guidance, and provision of administrative support to all organizational elements within the Ministry;
10. management of state property/assets that are the responsibility of the Ministry;
11. supervision of the implementation of tasks within the Ministry;
12. implementation of substantive support to all organizational elements within the Ministry; and
13. implementation of other functions assigned by the President.

== Organizational structure ==
Based on Presidential Decree No. 6/2026 and Ministry of Primary and Secondary Education Decree No.1/2024 the Ministry of Primary and Secondary Education consists of:

- Office of the Ministry of Primary and Secondary Education
- Office of the First Deputy Ministry of Primary and Secondary Education
- Office of the Second Deputy Ministry of Primary and Secondary Education
- Office of Secretariat General
  - Bureau of Planning and Partnerships
  - Bureau of Finance and State Properties
  - Bureau of Organization and Human Resources
  - Bureau of Legal Affairs
  - Bureau of Communication and Public Relations
  - Bureau of General Affairs and Procurement
- Board of Experts
  - Senior Expert to the Minister for Regulation and Inter-Institutional Relations
  - Senior Expert to the Minister for Talent Management
  - Senior Expert to the Minister for Educational Technology
- Directorate General of Teachers and Education Personnel
  - Directorate General of Teachers, Education Personnel, and Teacher Education Secretariat
  - Directorate of Teachers Professional Education
  - Directorate of Headmasters, Superintendents, and Education Personnel
  - Directorate of Preschool Teachers and Non-formal Education Institution Teachers
  - Directorate of Primary School Teachers
  - Directorate of Secondary School Teachers and Special Needs Teachers
- Directorate General of Early Childhood Education, Basic Education, and Non-Formal and Informal Education
  - Directorate General of Early Childhood Education, Elementary Education, and Secondary Education Secretariat
  - Directorate of Early Childhood Education
  - Directorate of Elementary Schools
  - Directorate of Junior High Schools
  - Directorate of Senior High Schools
- Directorate General of Secondary Education and Special Education
  - Directorate General of Vocational Education, Special Education, and Special Service Education Secretariat
  - Directorate of Vocational Senior High Schools
  - Directorate of Courses and Training
  - Directorate of Special Education and Special Service Education
  - Directorate of Non-formal and Informal Education
- Inspectorate General
  - Inspectorate General Secretariat
  - Inspectorate I
  - Inspectorate II
  - Inspectorate III
  - Investigative Inspectorate
- Agency for Primary and Secondary Education Policies
  - Center for Education Standards and Policies
  - Center for Curricula and Learning
  - Center for Education Assessment
  - Center for Book Affairs
- Language Development and Fostering Agency
  - Center for Language and Literatures Development and Protection
  - Center for Language and Literatures Fostering
  - Center for Language and Literatures Empowerment
- Centers
  - Center for Data, Information, and Technology
  - Center for Human Resources Training
  - Center for Character Strengthening
  - Center for National Achievement
  - Center for Education Funding Services

== Nomenclature ==
- Department of Teaching (1945–1948)
- Department of Education and Culture (1948–1955, 1966–1999)
- Department of Teaching, Education, and Culture (1955–1966)
- Department of National Education (1999–2009)
- Ministry of National Education (2009–2011)
- Ministry of Education and Culture (2011–2021)
- Ministry of Education, Culture, Research, and Technology (2021–2024)
- Ministry of Primary and Secondary Education (2024-present)

== See also ==
- Cabinet of Indonesia
- List of government ministries of Indonesia
