= Walisongo State Islamic University =

Walisongo State Islamic University (WSIU)
- Universitas Islam Negeri Walisongo Semarang
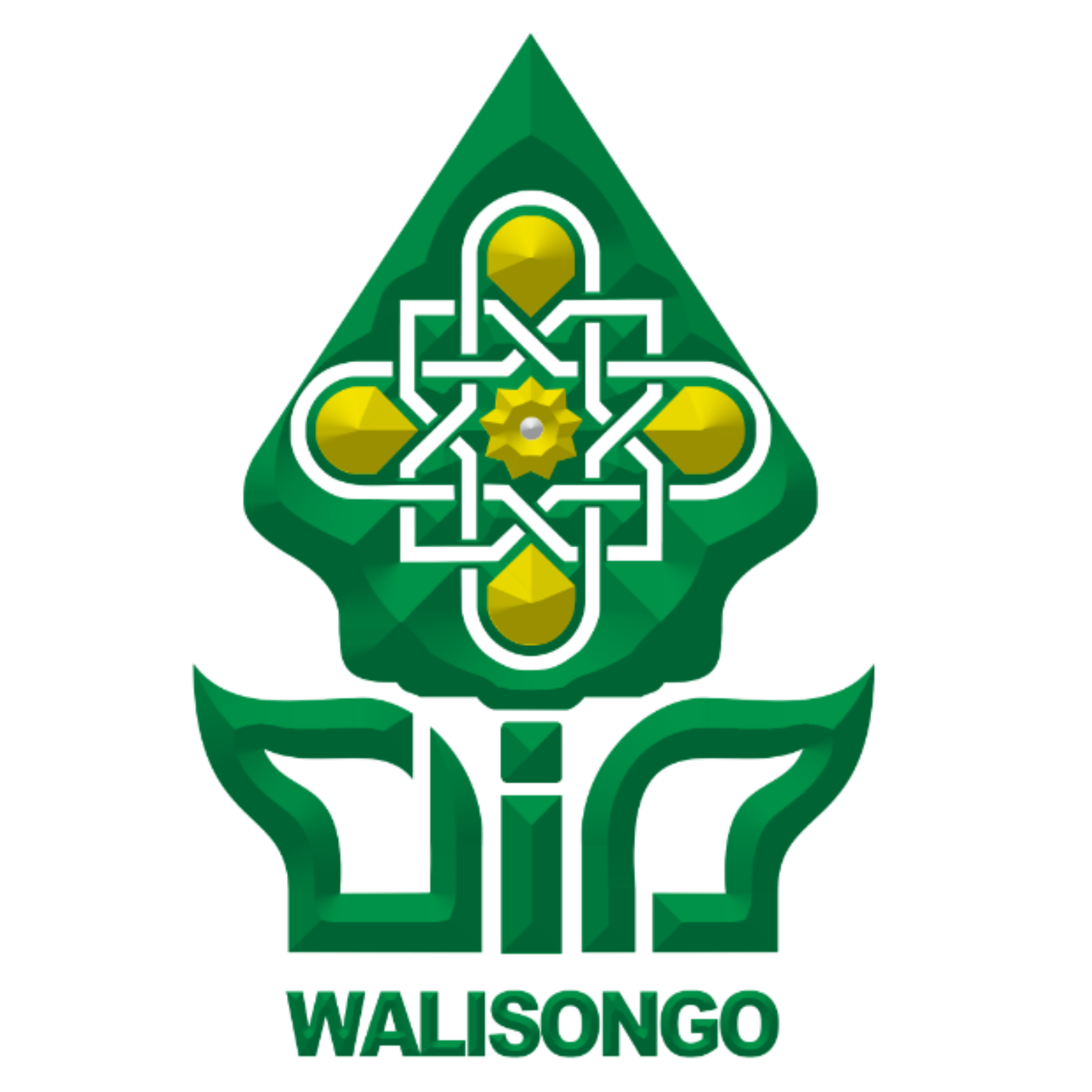
- Walisongo State Islamic University Logo
- Former name: IAIN Walisongo
- Type: State University
- Established: 6 April 1970
- Rector: Prof. Dr. H. Musahadi, M.Ag.
- Students: around 20,000
- Location: Semarang, Central Java, Indonesia; 6.987111°S 110.359389°E
- Colours: Green
- Website: walisongo.ac.id
- Location in Semarang

Walisongo State Islamic University (UIN Walisongo) is a public university in Indonesia. It is also called Universitas Islam Negeri (UIN) Walisongo Semarang and located in Semarang, Central Java, Indonesia.

== Faculty ==
| Faculty | Program |
|---|---|
| Fakultas Ilmu Tarbiyah dan Keguruan (Faculty of Education and Teacher Training) | Pendidikan Agama Islam (Islamic Education); Pendidikan Bahasa Arab (Arabic Education); Manajemen Pendidikan Islam (Islamic Educational Management); Pendidikan Bahasa Inggris (English Education); Pendidikan Guru Madrasah Ibtidaiyah (Madrasah Ibtidaiyah Teacher Education); Pendidikan Islam Anak Usia Dini (Raudhatul Athfal Teacher Education) |
| Fakultas Ushuluddin dan Humaniora (Faculty of Usul al-Din and Humanity) | Studi Agama-Agama (Comparative Religion); Akidah dan Filsafat Islam (Aqidah and Philosophy Islam); Ilmu Al-Qur'an dan Tafsir (Al-Qur'an and Hadist); Tasawuf dan Psikoterapi (Tasawuf and Psychotherapy); Ilmu Seni dan Aksitektur Islam (Islamic Art and Architecture) |
| Fakultas Syari'ah dan Hukum (Faculty of Sharia and Law) | Hukum Keluarga /Ahwal Shakhsiyyah (Islamic Family Law); Hukum Pidana Islam /Jinayah Siyasah (Criminal Law & Islamic State Structure); Hukum Ekonomi Syari`ah/Muamalat (Islamic Economics); Ilmu Falak (Islamic Astronomy); Ilmu Hukum (Law) |
| Fakultas Ekonomi dan Bisnis Islam (Faculty of Islamic Economics and Business) | Perbankan Syari'ah (Islamic Banking); Ekonomi Islam (Sharia Economics); Akuntansi Syari'ah (Islamic Banking); Manajemen (Management) |
| Fakultas Dakwah dan Komunikasi (Faculty of Da'wa and Communication) | Komunikasi dan Penyiaran Islam ( Islamic Communications and Broadcasting); Journalism Concentration; Advertising Concentration; Broadcasting Concentration; Bimbingan dan Penyuluhan Islam (Islamic Guidance and Counseling); Mental Guidance Concentration; Civics Guidance Concentration; Manajemen Dakwah (Propagation management); Pengembangan Masyarakat Islam (Islamic Community Development); Manajemen Haji dan Umroh (Hajj and Umrah Management) |
| Fakultas Sains dan Teknologi (Faculty of Science and Technology) | Pendidikan Matematika (Mathematics Education); Pendidikan Biologi (Biology Education); Pendidikan Kimia (Chemistry Education); Pendidikan Fisika (Physics Education); Matematika (Mathematics); Biologi (Biology); Kimia (Chemistry); Fisika (Physics); Teknologi Informasi (Information Technology); Teknik Lingkungan |
| Fakultas Psikologi dan Kesehatan (Faculty of Psychology and Healthy) | Gizi (Nutrition); Psikologi (Psychology) |
| Fakultas Ilmu Sosial dan Ilmu Politik (Faculty of Social and Political Sciences) | Sosiologi (Sociology); Ilmu Politik (political science) |
| Fakultas Kedokteran (faculty of medicine) | Kedokteran (Medicine); Pendidikan Profesi dokter (Medical Doctor Profession Education) |
| Program Pascasarjana (Post Graduate School) | Pendidikan Agama Islam (Islamic Education); Manajemen Pendidikan Islam (Islamic Educational Management); Ilmu Al-Qur'an dan Tafsir (Al-Qur'an and Hadist); Ilmu Falak (Islamic Astronomy); Komunikasi dan Penyiaran Islam (Islamic Communications and Broadcasting); Ekonomi Islam (Sharia Economics); Ilmu Agama Islam (Islamic Religious Studies); Studi Islam (Islamic Studies) [Doctor] |

== Facilities ==
- Wifi
- E-Journal
- Education Laboratory
- Science and Mathematics Laboratory
- Language Laboratory
- Da'wa Laboratory
- Psychotherapy laboratory
- Falak laboratory
- Law Laboratory
- Sports and Art facility
- Library
- Wisma Walisongo
- Ma'had Walisongo
- America Corner
