= Ministry of Education, Culture, Research, and Technology =

Government ministry of Indonesia

- Kementerian Pendidikan, Kebudayaan, Riset, dan Teknologi
- Seal of Ministry of Education, Culture, Research, and Technology

- Flag of the Ministry of Education, Culture, Research, and Technology

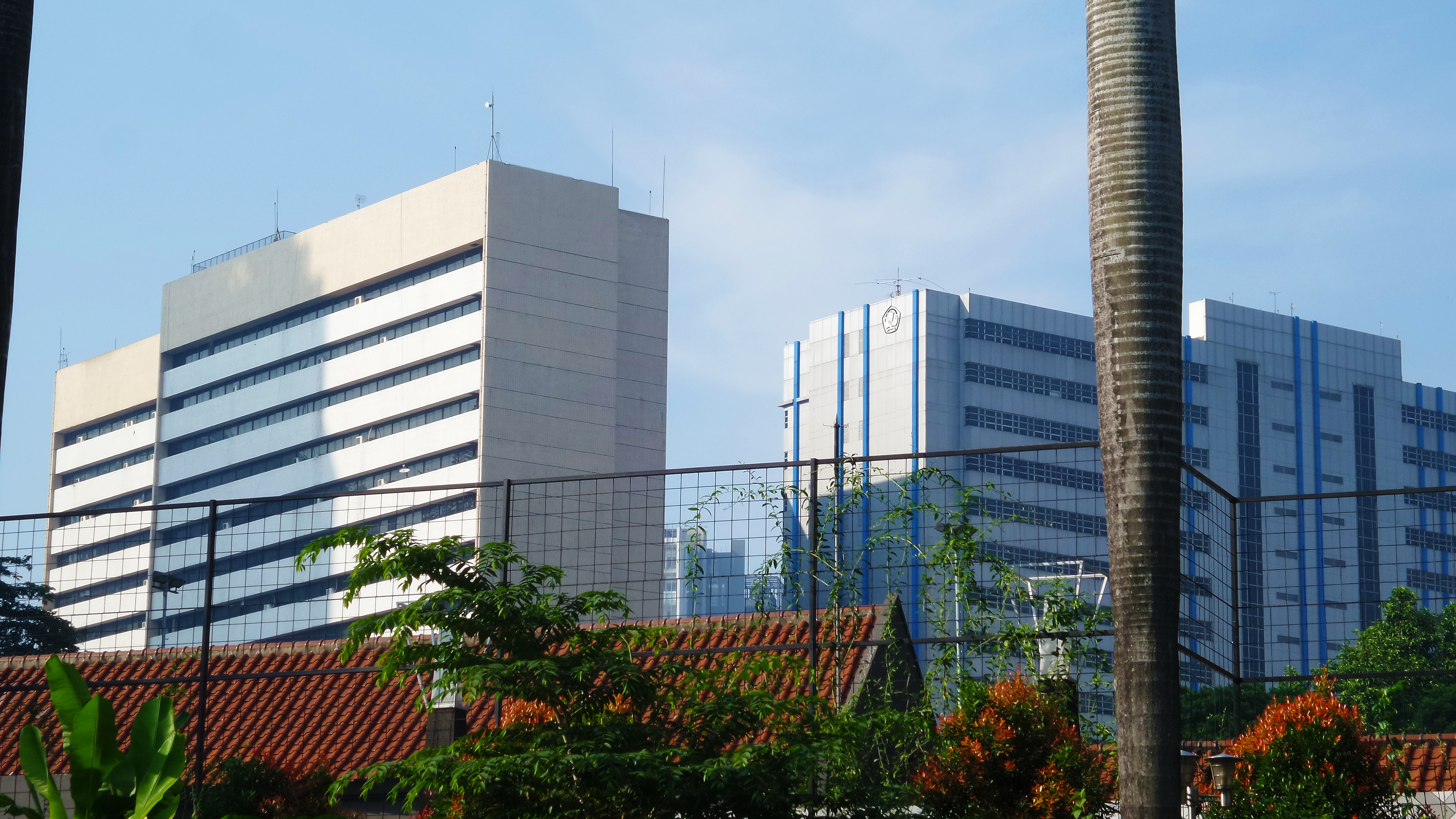
- Office of the Minister of Education, Culture, Research, and Technology

Ministry overview
- Formed: 19 August 1945; 80 years ago as Department of Teaching; 28 April 2021; 5 years ago as its current form
- Preceding agencies: Ministry of Education and Culture; Ministry of Research and Technology/National Research and Innovation Agency
- Dissolved: 20 October 2024
- Superseding agencies: Ministry of Primary and Secondary Education; Ministry of Higher Education, Science and Technology; Ministry of Cultural Affairs
- Jurisdiction: Government of Indonesia
- Motto: Tut Wuri Handayani (Javanese, from Ki Hajar Dewantara's maxim) ("Encouraging from the rear")
- Ministry executive: Nadiem Makarim, Minister of Education, Culture, Research, and Technology (First and only)
- Website: kemdikbud.go.id

The Ministry of Education, Culture, Research, and Technology (Indonesian: Kementerian Pendidikan, Kebudayaan, Riset, dan Teknologi, abbreviated Kemendikbudristek) was a government ministry of the Indonesian government responsible for education, cultural, research, and technology affairs. Its formation resulted from the merger of the Ministry of Education and Culture and the Ministry of Research and Technology in April 2021. In October 2024, under the Red White Cabinet, the ministry was split into three ministries: Ministry of Primary and Secondary Education, Ministry of Higher Education, Science and Technology, and Ministry of Cultural Affairs.

== History ==
=== Formation ===
On 30 March 2021, President Joko Widodo submitted a Presidential Letter to People's Representative Council, which contained a proposal for major changes in the national cabinet, one of which was the merger of the Ministry of Research and Technology and the Ministry of Education and Culture into one ministry named the Ministry of Education, Culture, Research, and Technology. The National Research and Innovation Agency (Indonesian: Badan Riset dan Inovasi Nasional, abbreviated BRIN) was to be separated as a new non-ministerial agency.

On 9 April 2021, the People's Representative Council approved the proposal, along with the creation of the new Ministry of Investment. On 13 April 2021, Ali Mochtar Ngabalin, a spokesperson for and specialist of the Presidential Staff Office, announced that a second reshuffle of the Onward Indonesia Cabinet was to take place on second week of April 2021. The reshuffle was finally announced on 28 April 2021. It was the first of its kind, because not only were the ministers reshuffled, but cabinet institutions were also disbanded mid-term. In this reshuffle, Nadiem Makarim was appointed as the first Minister of Education, Culture, Research, and Technology, according to the Presidential Decision No. 72/P/2021. On the same day, the President formally recognized the ministry as one of the thirty-four Indonesian government ministries.

On 30 July 2021, President Joko Widodo issued the permanent constituting document of the ministry, Presidential Decree No. 62/2021. The decree itself backdated to 15 July 2021.

==== Reception ====
Hasto Kristiyanto, the General Secretary of the Indonesian Democratic Party of Struggle, praised the move. He expressed his hope that, with the merger, the now independent BRIN would play an important role in accelerating the growth of research in Indonesia. The Deputy Chief of Commission X in the People's Representative Council, Hetifah Syaifudian of Golkar, also praised the move. She commented that the merger might help the research synergy between academia and research agencies.

==== Criticism ====
The deputy chief of the Prosperous Justice Party faction in the People's Representative Council Mulyanto from the opposition criticized the decision, saying that the change was not effective. He claimed that the government had not learned from the previous merger of the Ministry of Research and Technology and the General Directorate of Higher Education, which formed the Ministry of Research, Technology, and Higher Education. While the merger was successful, Mulyanto claimed that the ministry was not effective when combined to manage research and technology development and educational affairs. He also cited that in previous cabinet, the administrative migration and adaptation processes in a new ministry required at least three years. Not only that, the presence of the non-ministerial National Research and Innovation Agency to coordinate and facilitate state research and development would result in an overlap with some of the tasks of the ministry.

The governing coalition also voiced criticisms. While the Chief of Commission X in the People's Representative Council, Syaiful Huda of the National Awakening Party, praised the move, he criticized the timing of the formation of the new ministry, happening in the middle of the second term of the ruling government, when normally such a major change would have been done earlier. Citing the issue of lengthy administrative migration and adaptation processes, Huda urged that the transitional process must be done as soon as possible, in a maximum time of one year after the formation of the new ministry, stressing the importance of research during the COVID-19 pandemic. He also commented that such a merger will put heavy load to the new ministry because both of preceding ministries had very different focuses.

In the aftermath of the release of the Presidential Decree No. 62/2021, the formation of the General Directorate of Higher Education, Research, and Technology was also criticized by officials of the ministry. An official from the Quality Control Department, Johannes Gunawan, criticized the government for not learning from failures of the past, citing past mismanagement of expert personnel.

=== 2022 Curriculum Reform ===
In 2022, the ministry initiated curriculum policy options as part of efforts to mitigate learning loss and as a form of learning recovery. The ministry provides three options for educational units to implement a curriculum based on the National Education Standards that was in accordance with the learning needs and context of each educational unit. The three options are as follows:

- using the 2013 Curriculum completely
- using the Emergency Curriculum
- using the Independent Curriculum

The ministry launched the Independent Curriculum (Indonesian: Kurikulum Merdeka) as part of learning activities' recovery process. The curriculum was designed to be more flexible, focus on essential material, and develop students' character and competence. The main characteristics of this curriculum that support learning recovery are:

- Project-based learning for soft skills and character development according to the profile of Pancasila students
- Focus on essential material so that there was sufficient time for in-depth study of basic competencies such as literacy and numeracy.
- Flexibility for teachers to carry out differentiated learning according to the abilities of students and make adjustments to local contexts and content.

=== 2022 Shadow Organization Disclosure ===
Unlike other ministries in Indonesia, the Ministry of Education, Culture, Research, and Technology possessed a shadow organization outside its structure, which was quite large in size and plays a significant role in ministry policies and outputs. The shadow organization's presence was disclosed in September 2022. The organization was described as "unusual and abnormal" with around 400 members, comparable in size to a General Directorate of a ministry, from product managers, data scientists, and software engineers. The shadow organization performed some extent of research and development activities on behalf of the Ministry. The presence of the organization surprised many Indonesians, as for the first time in Indonesian politics a shadow organization was used by a ministry. For the disclosure, Nadiem confirmed the existence of the shadow organization and the shadow organization actually a legal tenderized collaboration between the ministry with GovTech Edu, a state-owned company subsidiary of Telkom. Such move criticized by People's Representative Council, and mass organizations advocating teachers' welfare and education. Critics criticized that such move was "wasteful" and "disrespectful" towards thousands original human resources employed by the ministry.

=== 2025 investigation of Chromebook procurement scandal ===
Since May 2025, the Attorney General's Office of Indonesia is currently investigating the scandal involving the procurement of Chromebook laptops between 2019 and 2023.

== Organizational structure ==
The minister of education, culture, research, and technology, appointed by the president at his own discretion, was by Presidential Decree No. 62 of 2021. The head of the Ministry of Education, Culture, Research, and Technology, under and responsible to the president. The decree also created the Office of Deputy Minister of Education, Culture, Research, and Technology, though it was currently vacant.

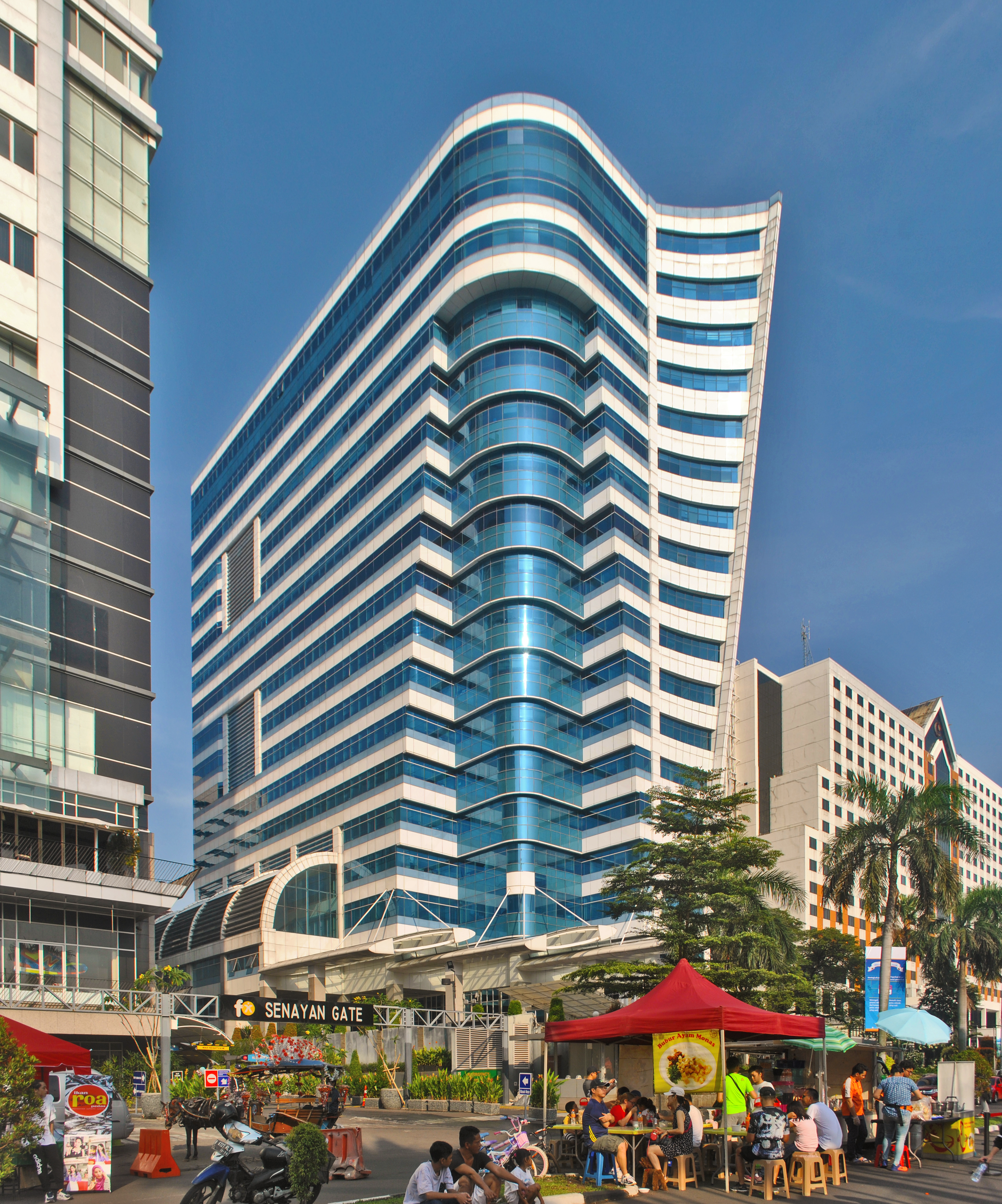
Building of the Directorate General of Higher Education, Research, and Technology

Initially, the organizational structure of the ministry was a direct merger of the structures of the two preceding cabinet ministries. However, the structure was deemed too large and ineffective.

The structure of the Ministry was expanded by Ministerial Decree No. 28/2021, and updated with Ministerial Decree No. 16/2024 into:

- Office of the Minister of Education, Culture, Research, and Technology
- Special Advisor on Institutional and Public Relationship
- Special Advisor on Innovation
- Special Advisor on Regulation
- Special Advisor on Talent Management
- Special Advisor on Cultural Heritage
- Office of Secretariat General
  - Bureau of Planning
  - Bureau of Finance and State Owned Assets
  - Bureau of Human Resources Affairs
  - Bureau of Organization and Institutional Management
  - Bureau of Legal Affair
  - Bureau of Cooperation and Public Relations
  - Bureau of General Affair and Procurement of Goods and Services
- Directorate General of Teacher and Education Personnel
  - Secretariat of Directorate General of Teacher and Education Personnel
  - Directorate of Professional Development of Teacher
  - Directorate of Teacher for Early Childhood Education and Community Education
  - Directorate of School Principals, School Supervisor, and Education Personnel
  - Directorate of Teacher for Primary Education and Secondary Education
  - Directorate of Teacher for Second Secondary Education and Special Education
  - Technical Implementation Units
    - Professional Development Center for Educators of North Sumatera Province
    - Professional Development Center for Educators of West Java Province
    - Professional Development Center for Educators of Central Java Province
    - Professional Development Center for Educators of East Java Province
    - Professional Development Center for Educators of Yogyakarta Province
    - Professional Development Center for Educators of South Sulawesi Province
    - Professional Development Center for Educators of Aceh Province
    - Professional Development Center for Educators of West Sumatera Province
    - Professional Development Center for Educators of Riau Province
    - Professional Development Center for Educators of Jambi Province
    - Professional Development Center for Educators of Lampung Province
    - Professional Development Center for Educators of Banten Province
    - Professional Development Center for Educators of Bali Province
    - Professional Development Center for Educators of West Nusa Tenggara Province
    - Professional Development Center for Educators of East Nusa Tenggara Province
    - Professional Development Center for Educators of West Kalimantan Province
    - Professional Development Center for Educators of East Kalimantan Province
    - Professional Development Center for Educators of South Kalimantan Province
    - Professional Development Center for Educators of Central Kalimantan Province
    - Professional Development Center for Educators of North Sulawesi Province
    - Professional Development Center for Educators of Southeast Sulawesi Province
    - Professional Development Center for Educators of Central Sulawesi Province
    - Professional Development Center for Educators of Maluku Province
    - Professional Development Center for Educators of Papua Province
    - Professional Development Center for Educators of West Papua Province
    - Professional Development Center for Educators of Riau Islands Province
    - Professional Development Center for Educators of Bangka Belitung Islands Province
    - Professional Development Center for Educators of West Papua Province
    - Professional Development Center for Educators of North Kalimantan Province
    - Professional Development Center for Educators of West Sulawesi Province
    - Professional Development Center for Educators of Gorontalo Province
    - Professional Development Center for Educators of North Maluku Province
- Directorate General of Early Childhood Education, Primary Education, and Secondary Education
  - Secretariat of Directorate General of Early Childhood Education, Primary Education, and Secondary Education
  - Directorate of Early Childhood Education
  - Directorate of Primary School
  - Directorate of Secondary School
  - Directorate of Second Secondary School
  - Directorate of Community Education and Special Education
  - Technical Implementation Units
    - Education Quality Assurance Center of West Sumatera Province
    - Education Quality Assurance Center of West Java Province
    - Education Quality Assurance Center of Central Java Province
    - Education Quality Assurance Center of East Java Province
    - Education Quality Assurance Center of South Sulawesi Province
    - Education Quality Assurance Center of Aceh Province
    - Education Quality Assurance Center of North Sumatera Province
    - Education Quality Assurance Center of Riau Province
    - Education Quality Assurance Center of Riau Islands Province
    - Education Quality Assurance Center of Jambi Province
    - Education Quality Assurance Center of Bengkulu Province
    - Education Quality Assurance Center of Bangka Belitung Islands Province
    - Education Quality Assurance Center of South Sumatera Province
    - Education Quality Assurance Center of Lampung Province
    - Education Quality Assurance Center of Banten Province
    - Education Quality Assurance Center of DKI Jakarta Province
    - Education Quality Assurance Center of DI Yogyakarta Province
    - Education Quality Assurance Center of Bali Province
    - Education Quality Assurance Center of West Nusa Tenggara Province
    - Education Quality Assurance Center of East Nusa Tenggara Province
    - Education Quality Assurance Center of West Kalimantan Province
    - Education Quality Assurance Center of East Kalimantan Province
    - Education Quality Assurance Center of South Kalimantan Province
    - Education Quality Assurance Center of Central Kalimantan Province
    - Education Quality Assurance Center of North Sulawesi Province
    - Education Quality Assurance Center of Southeast Sulawesi Province
    - Education Quality Assurance Center of Central Sulawesi Province
    - Education Quality Assurance Center of North Kalimantan Province
    - Education Quality Assurance Center of West Sulawesi Province
    - Education Quality Assurance Center of South Sulawesi Province
    - Education Quality Assurance Center of Gorontalo Province
    - Education Quality Assurance Center of Maluku Province
    - Education Quality Assurance Center of North Maluku Province
    - Education Quality Assurance Center of Papua Province
    - Education Quality Assurance Center of West Papua Province
- Directorate General of Vocational Education
  - Secretariat of Directorate General for Vocational Education
  - Directorate of Vocational Secondary School
  - Directorate of Academic Vocational Higher Education
  - Directorate of Institutions and Resources of Vocational Higher Education
  - Directorate of Courses and Training
  - Directorate of Partnership and Alignment of Vocational Education with Business and Industry
  - Technical Implementation Units
    - Quality Assurance Development Center for Vocational Education in Arts and Culture
    - Quality Assurance Development Center for Vocational Education in Construction and Electricity
    - Quality Assurance Development Center for Vocational Education in Business and Tourism
    - Quality Assurance Development Center for Vocational Education in Agriculture
    - Quality Assurance Development Center for Vocational Education in Mechanical and Industrial Engineering
    - Quality Assurance Development Center for Vocational Education in Automotive and Electronics
    - Quality Assurance Development Center for Vocational Education in Maritime, Fisheries, Information and Communication Technology
- Directorate General of Higher Education, Research, and Technology
  - Secretariat of Directorate General for Higher Education, Research, and Technology
  - Directorate of Learning and Student Affair
  - Directorate of Institutional
  - Directorate of Resources for Higher Education
  - Directorate of Research, Technology, and Community Service
- Directorate General of Culture
  - Secretariat of Directorate General of Culture
  - Directorate of Belief in the God Almighty and Customary Law Communities
  - Directorate of Film, Music, and Media
  - Directorate of Cultural Protection
  - Directorate of Culture Development and Utilization
  - Directorate of Cultural Human Resource and Cultural Institutions Empowerment
  - Technical Implementation Units
    - Museum and Cultural Heritage (Indonesian Heritage Agency)
    - Cultural Preservation Office Region I
    - Cultural Preservation Office Region II
    - Cultural Preservation Office Region III
    - Cultural Preservation Office Region IV
    - Cultural Preservation Office Region V
    - Cultural Preservation Office Region VI
    - Cultural Preservation Office Region VII
    - Cultural Preservation Office Region VIII
    - Cultural Preservation Office Region IX
    - Cultural Preservation Office Region X
    - Cultural Preservation Office Region XI
    - Cultural Preservation Office Region XII
    - Cultural Preservation Office Region XIII
    - Cultural Preservation Office Region XIV
    - Cultural Preservation Office Region XV
    - Cultural Preservation Office Region XVI
    - Cultural Preservation Office Region XVII
    - Cultural Preservation Office Region XVIII
    - Cultural Preservation Office Region XIX
    - Cultural Preservation Office Region XX
    - Cultural Preservation Office Region XXI
    - Cultural Preservation Office Region XXII
    - Cultural Preservation Office Region XXIII
    - Cultural Media Management Office
- Inspectorate General
  - Secretariat of Inspectorate General
  - Inspectorate I
  - Inspectorate II
  - Inspectorate III
  - Inspectorate IV
  - Inspectorate of Investigation
- Agency for Standard, Curriculum, and Assessment in Education
  - Secretariat of Agency for Standard, Curriculum, and Assessment in Education
  - Center for Education Standard and Policy
  - Center for Educational Assessment
  - Center for Curriculum and Instruction
  - Center for Book Affairs
  - Technical Implementation Units
    - Center for Education Testing Services
- Language Development and Fostering Agency
  - Secretariat of Agency for Language Development and Cultivation
  - Center for Development and Preservation of Language and Literature
  - Center for Cultivation of Language and Literature
  - Center for Strengthening and Empowerment of Language
  - Technical Implementation Units
    - Language Agency of East Java Province
    - Language Agency of Bali Province
    - Language Agency of Aceh Province
    - Language Agency of North Sumatera Province
    - Language Agency of Riau Province
    - Language Agency of West Sumatera Province
    - Language Agency of South Sumatera Province
    - Language Agency of West Java Province
    - Language Agency of Central Java Province
    - Language Agency of Yogyakarta Province
    - Language Agency of West Kalimantan Province
    - Language Agency of Central Kalimantan Province
    - Language Agency of South Kalimantan Province
    - Language Agency of North Sulawesi Province
    - Language Agency of Central Sulawesi Province
    - Language Agency of South Sulawesi Province
    - Language Agency of Papua Province
    - Language Agency of Jambi Province
    - Language Agency of Bengkulu Province
    - Language Agency of Riau Islands Province
    - Language Agency of Bangka Belitung Islands Province
    - Language Agency of Lampung Province
    - Language Agency of Banten Province
    - Language Agency of East Kalimantan Province
    - Language Agency of West Nusa Tenggara Province
    - Language Agency of East Nusa Tenggara Province
    - Language Agency of Southeast Sulawesi Province
    - Language Agency of Gorontalo Province
    - Language Agency of Maluku Province
    - Language Agency of North Maluku Province
- Film Censorship Institution
  - Secretariat of Film Censorship Institution
- Higher Education Service Institutes
  - Agency for Higher Education Service Region I
  - Agency for Higher Education Service Region II
  - Agency for Higher Education Service Region III
  - Agency for Higher Education Service Region IV
  - Agency for Higher Education Service Region V
  - Agency for Higher Education Service Region VI
  - Agency for Higher Education Service Region VII
  - Agency for Higher Education Service Region VIII
  - Agency for Higher Education Service Region IX
  - Agency for Higher Education Service Region X
  - Agency for Higher Education Service Region XI
  - Agency for Higher Education Service Region XII
  - Agency for Higher Education Service Region XIII
  - Agency for Higher Education Service Region XIV
  - Agency for Higher Education Service Region XV
  - Agency for Higher Education Service Region XVI
  - Agency for Higher Education Service Region XVII
- Centers
  - Center for Data and Information Technology
    - Center for Technology Platform Services
  - Center for Training of Education and Cultural Human Resources
  - Center for National Talent Development
    - Center for Talent Development and Recognition
  - Center for Character Building
  - Center for Education Financing Services
    - Center for Higher Education Funding and Financing

A smaller version of the Ministry of Research and Technology, the General Directorate of Higher Education, Research, and Technology, was created within the ministry in pursuance of Presidential Decree No. 62/2021, to govern and regulate science, research, and technology in Indonesia after dismantlement of Ministry of Research and Technology. Despite that, the coordination between the ministry and the National Research and Innovation Agency (BRIN) was not yet made clear in the constituting document. Minister Nadiem Makarim asserted that BRIN was a partner of the ministry in performing researches, and not a subordinate of the ministry. While the presidential decree did not clearly separate the scope of the limitation of the ministry and coordination with BRIN, the Ministerial Decree No. 28/2021 distinguished BRIN as a separate entity and clearly outlined the ministry's power in regulating scientific, research, and technology affairs, confirming Makarim's statement. The ministerial decree also confirmed the relinquishment of its National Archaeology Research Institute to BRIN.

As overseer of science, research, and technology in Indonesia, the Ministry has roles to oversee and preparing regulations and technical policies of science, research, and technology. Despite overseer rule, Ministry of Education, Culture, Research, and Technology also have research functions, but only limited to academic research. State research and development activities, non-academic governmental strategic research, and policy research are performed by BRIN.

== New Era ==
After Prabowo Subianto was inaugurated as a President of Indonesia, under the Red White Cabinet, the ministry was split into three ministries, there are: Ministry of Primary and Secondary Education, Ministry of Higher Education, Science and Technology, and Ministry of Cultural Affairs.

== See also ==
- Cabinet of Indonesia
- List of government ministries of Indonesia
