= Riau Malay language =

Dialect continuum of Malayic languages in Riau, Indonesia

Riau Malay
- Bahase Melayu Riau; Bahaso Melayu Riau بهاس ملايو رياو
- Pronunciation: [ba.ha.sə mə.la.ju ri.au] (coastal dialect) [ba.ha.so mə.la.ju ri.au] (inland dialect)
- Native to: Indonesia (Riau, Riau Islands and North Sumatra)
- Region: Throughout Riau and the Riau Islands. Also spoken in parts of Labuhanbatu Regency in North Sumatra
- Ethnicity: Riau Malays
- Native speakers: 3,000,000 (2010)
- Language family: Austronesian: Malayo-Polynesian; disputed: Malayo-Sumbawan or Greater North Borneo; Malayic; Riau Malay
- Dialects: Indragiri Hulu; Kampar (disputed); Kuantan (disputed); Pangaraian; Pelalawan; Riau Coastal; Rokan Hilir; Siak; Tembilahan; Standard Indonesian
- Writing system: Latin (Indonesian alphabet); Jawi

Language codes
- ISO 639-3: zlm
- Linguist List: zlm-rim
- Glottolog: riau1234
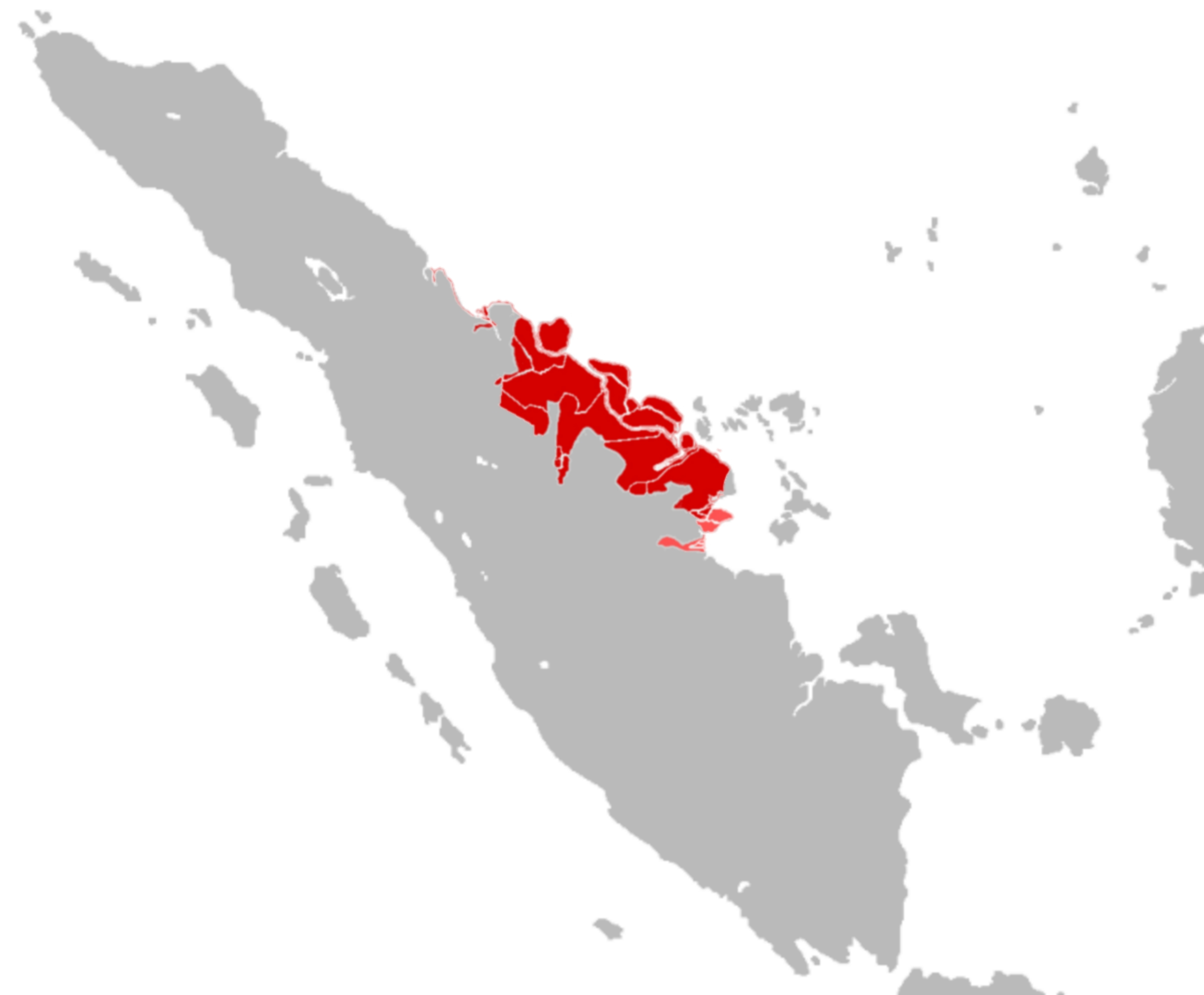
- Regions where Riau Malay is spoken (excluding the Riau Islands): Regions where Riau Malay language is native and spoken predominantly Regions where Riau Malay language (mixed with another languages) spoken predominantly

Riau Malay (Riau Malay: Bahase Melayu Riau or Bahaso Melayu Riau, Jawi: بهاس ملايو رياو) is a collection of Malayic languages primarily spoken by the Riau Malays in Riau and the Riau Islands in Indonesia. The language is not a single entity but rather a dialect continuum consisting of numerous dialects, some of which differ significantly from one another. Each of these dialects has its own subdialects or isolects, which also exhibit differences from one another. Due to the influx of migrants from other parts of Indonesia, some Riau Malay dialects have been influenced by other regional languages of Indonesia, such as Bugis, Banjarese and Minangkabau. The Riau Malay dialect spoken on Penyengat Island in Tanjung Pinang, once the seat of the Riau-Lingga Sultanate, was recognized by the Dutch during the colonial era and became the lingua franca across the Indonesian archipelago. The Dutch standardized form of the Penyengat Riau Malay, known as Netherland Indies Malay, eventually evolved into standard Indonesian, the national language of Indonesia. To this day, Riau Malay remains widely used as a lingua franca in Riau and the surrounding regions, alongside Indonesian. Most Riau Malays are bilingual, fluent in both Riau Malay and Indonesian.

Riau Malay is the most widely used regional language in Riau, both before and after the division of the Riau Islands. However, only 65% of the Malay population in Riau use it as their daily language. In addition, Riau Malay can be found in Malay literature, both written and oral. Traditional Malay literary works commonly found in Riau include pantun, syair, gurindam, and hikayat. The use of Riau Malay is under threat due to modernization and the growing influence of standard Indonesian, the official language of education. However, efforts are being made by both the government and local Riau Malay communities to preserve the language. These efforts include promoting the use of traditional oral literature. Additionally, the Jawi script, the traditional writing system of Riau Malay before the introduction of the Latin script during European colonization, is now being taught in schools across Riau as part of the local language curriculum.

== Classification ==
Riau Malay is a Malayic language. Speakers of Malayic languages are spread from Brunei, Indonesia, Malaysia, Singapore, Southern Thailand, to the southernmost part of the Philippines. Malay is a member of the Austronesian family of languages, which includes languages from Taiwan, Southeast Asia, and the Pacific Ocean, with a smaller number in continental Asia. Malagasy, a geographic outlier spoken in Madagascar in the Indian Ocean, is also a member of this language family. Although these languages are not necessarily mutually intelligible to any extent, their similarities are often quite apparent. In more conservative languages like Malay, many roots have come with relatively little change from their common ancestor, Proto-Austronesian. There are many cognates found in the languages' words for kinship, health, body parts and common animals. Numbers, especially, show remarkable similarities.

Riau Malay is closely related to neighboring languages such as Minangkabau and Jambi Malay. It shares a significant number of lexical items with Minangkabau. Some Riau Malay dialects, particularly those spoken in western Riau near the West Sumatra border, also exhibit strong Minangkabau influence. The Pangaraian dialect spoken in Rokan Hulu, for example, shows considerable influence from both Minangkabau and Mandailing. The status of the Kampar and Kuantan varieties is debated. These varieties are sometimes considered dialects of Riau Malay, and most of their speakers identify as Riau Malays. However, some linguists classify them as dialects of Minangkabau due to their significant lexical and phonological influence from Minangkabau. The two languages are also generally very similar and mutually intelligible with the Minangkabau spoken in West Sumatra. The Tembilahan dialect, spoken in Indragiri Hilir in southeastern Riau, on the other hand, shows significant influence from Banjarese due to the large population of Banjarese migrants from South Kalimantan in the region.

The variety of Malay spoken in the northernmost regencies of the Riau Islands, Anambas and Natuna, is very different from Riau Malay and not mutually intelligible with it. As a result, these varieties are generally not considered dialects of Riau Malay. The Anambas Malay dialect shares some similarities with Pontianak Malay, spoken in West Kalimantan, and Belitung Malay, spoken in the Bangka-Belitung Islands, particularly in terms of vocabulary and phonology. In contrast, the Malay dialect spoken in Natuna is strongly influenced by Terengganu Malay and Pahang Malay, which are spoken in the Malaysian states of Terengganu and Pahang along the eastern coast of Peninsular Malaysia. Similarly, the aboriginal Malay languages spoken in Riau and the Riau Islands, such as Akit, Bonai, Talang Mamak, and the Orang Laut languages, are also generally not considered dialects of Riau Malay, although they are related to it to some extent.

== Geographic distribution and usage ==
Riau Malay is spoken throughout Riau and the Riau Islands. It is also spoken in the southeastern parts of North Sumatra that border Riau, particularly in Labuhanbatu Regency. Riau Malay is primarily spoken by the Riau Malays but is also used by members of other ethnic groups who have migrated from different regions of Indonesia, such as the Javanese. It is common for these communities to engage in code-mixing or code-switching between Riau Malay, standard Indonesian, and their native languages. In Pekanbaru, for example, where Minangkabau is the dominant language due to a large influx of migrants from West Sumatra, many people often code-switch between Minangkabau and Riau Malay, particularly in informal settings such as markets. In more formal settings, such as educational and government institutions, Indonesian, the national language, is generally preferred, as it serves as the primary lingua franca for interethnic communication.

In Riau, Riau Malay holds a significant role in the cultural life of the local Malay community. As the historical center of several Malay kingdoms and sultanates, the region has a strong cultural heritage that continues to influence the preservation and use of Riau Malay. However, the use of the Riau Malay language is increasingly under threat due to the influx of migrants from other parts of Indonesia, such as Java, who bring their own native languages. These migration flows were largely driven by the transmigration program, an initiative that began during the Dutch colonial era and was continued by the Indonesian government to resettle populations in less densely populated areas like Riau. Significant efforts have been made to preserve the use of Riau Malay. For example, many schools in Riau now include Riau Malay in their curriculum, often focusing on learning to write in the traditional Jawi script. Additionally, several universities in Riau offer programs in Malay literature, further supporting the preservation and study of the language and its cultural heritage. Furthermore, the Riau Malay Cultural Councils (Indonesian: Lembaga Adat Melayu Riau) have now been established across various regions of Riau. These councils function as cultural advocates and play an active role in supporting the preservation of the Riau Malay language and cultural heritage.

== Dialects ==
Each region in Riau and the Riau Islands has its own distinct dialects, which may also include subdialects that vary from one another. For instance, one village in Riau may speak a dialect that differs from another village's dialect. The exact number of Riau Malay dialects is a topic of debate. Hamidy (2002) identified six distinct dialects of Riau Malay, which are primarily differentiated by variations in intonation and vocabulary:

- Dialect of isolated communities
- Petalangan
- Rokan
- Rantau Kuantan
- Kampar
- Riau Coastal

Riau Malay can generally be divided into two main groups: inland dialects and coastal dialects. The inland dialects exhibit phonological features similar to Minangkabau, while the coastal dialects are closer to the Malay spoken in regions like Selangor, Johor, and Kuala Lumpur in Peninsular Malaysia. In addition to other distinguishing characteristics, the two groups differ in the pronunciation of words ending with the vowel /a/ in Indonesian. In the inland dialects, these words are pronounced with the vowel /o/, whereas in the coastal dialects, they are pronounced with the weak vowel /ə/. For example, the Indonesian words /bila/, /tiga/, and /kata/ (meaning "if," "three," and "word" in English, respectively) are pronounced as /bilo/, /tigo/, and /kato/ in the inland dialects, while in the coastal dialects, they are pronounced as /bilə/, /tigə/, and /katə/.

The most studied dialects of Riau Malay include the Indragiri Hulu dialect, Pangaraian dialect, Pelalawan, Riau Coastal dialect, Rokan Hilir dialect, Siak dialect, and Tembilahan dialect. The Kampar and Kuantan languages are often regarded as dialects of Riau Malay, although they are sometimes classified as dialects of Minangkabau due to their closer similarities to it than to other Malay dialects.

=== Indragiri Hulu ===
The Indragiri Hulu dialect is primarily spoken in Indragiri Hulu Regency. It shares many features with the Riau Coastal dialect. Additionally, some varieties of the Indragiri Hulu dialect exhibit influence from the Kuantan language, particularly in areas bordering Kuantan Singingi Regency.

=== Kampar and Kuantan ===
The Kampar and Kuantan languages are primarily spoken in Kampar Regency and Kuantan Singingi Regency in southwestern Riau, near the border with West Sumatra. Their linguistic classification remains a topic of debate, as they are variously regarded as dialects of either Riau Malay or Minangkabau. Both languages exhibit significant lexical and grammatical influence from Minangkabau and are generally mutually intelligible with some Minangkabau dialects. While the Minangkabau community often considers them part of the broader Minangkabau linguistic family, speakers of Kampar and Kuantan typically identify as Riau Malays and refer to their speech as dialects of Riau Malay. The Indonesian government’s classification of the Kuantan language is also inconsistent, sometimes categorizing it as a dialect of Minangkabau and at other times as part of Riau Malay. Geographically located between the Minangkabau-speaking region to the west and the Riau Malay-speaking region to the east, the Kampar and Kuantan languages have been shaped by mutual linguistic influence, forming part of a dialect continuum in central Sumatra.

=== Pangaraian ===
The Pangaraian dialect or the Rokan Hulu dialect is spoken in Rokan Hulu Regency, located in western Riau near the borders of North Sumatra and West Sumatra. This region serves as a linguistic and cultural crossroads, which has led to substantial influence from neighboring languages, particularly Minangkabau and Mandailing. These influences are largely the result of long-standing migration patterns, intermarriage, and trade between communities across provincial boundaries. The geographical distribution of Pangaraian Malay speakers overlaps significantly with that of the Mandailing people, an ethnic group originally from North Sumatra. As a result, frequent social interaction between the two groups has fostered widespread bilingualism. Many speakers of Pangaraian Malay are also proficient in the Mandailing language, and language mixing is commonly observed in informal communication. In addition to lexical borrowing, Pangaraian Malay also exhibits grammatical influence from Minangkabau. This includes the use of certain Minangkabau syntactic constructions, affixes, and pronouns that are not typically found in other Riau Malay dialects.

=== Pelalawan ===
The Pelalawan dialect is spoken in Pelalawan Regency. It is notably distinct from other Riau Malay dialects, particularly in terms of phonology. One prominent difference involves the vowels /o/ and /e/. In other Riau Malay dialects, the vowel /o/ often corresponds to /e/ in Pelalawan Malay. For instance, the word pesan ‘order’ is pronounced /pesan/ in Pelalawan Malay, but /posan/ in other Riau Malay dialects. In several varieties of Riau Malay, especially in inland areas, there is a tendency to either omit aspiration on consonants or replace it with other sounds. For example, the consonant /p/ may be pronounced as /b/ or /f/. The word pulang 'to go home', for instance, may be pronounced as /bulang/ or /fulang/. In contrast, Pelalawan Malay tends to maintain aspiration on consonants more consistently, with no significant phonetic deviations observed in the pronunciation of aspirated consonants. The dialect also exhibits influences from the Kampar language, owing to its proximity to Kampar Regency and the strong impact of Kampar’s traditions and culture in Pelalawan.

=== Riau Coastal ===
The Riau Coastal dialect is spoken along the coast of mainland Riau and throughout most parts of the Riau Islands, including areas such as Bagansiapiapi, Dumai, Bengkalis, Sungai Pakning, Tembilahan, Selat Panjang, Tanjung Balai Karimun, Tanjung Batu, and Tanjung Pinang. It is regarded as the prestige variety among all Malay dialects. One notable variant is the Penyengat dialect, spoken on Penyengat Island in Tanjung Pinang. Once the official language of the Riau-Lingga Sultanate, it is considered a precursor to modern Standard Indonesian. Regarded as 'High Malay,' it was adopted by the Dutch as the lingua franca of the Indonesian archipelago. This dialect also formed the basis for Pedoman Bahasa, a grammar book authored by the historian and linguist Raja Ali Haji, which became a key reference for the Malay language. The standardized form of Malay derived from this tradition (known as bahasa Melayu baku) was later proclaimed the national language, Bahasa Indonesia, at the Indonesian Youth Pledge on 28 October 1928.

The Riau Coastal dialect consists of several sub-dialects that have significant difference with one another, particularly in terms of phonology and vocabulary. For example, the Bengkalis dialect features the word-final vowel /ə/, while the Dumai and Bagansiapiapi dialects use /o/ endings, similar to those found in inland Riau Malay dialects. Due to the significant Chinese population in these areas, the Riau Coastal dialect has been influenced by Chinese language varieties such as Hokkien and Teochew, particularly the forms spoken by local Chinese communities. Code-mixing between Chinese languages and Riau Coastal Malay is common among Chinese speakers in the region, often alongside Indonesian. Some Malay individuals are even able to speak Chinese dialects, a result of frequent interactions between the native Malay and Chinese communities.

=== Rokan Hilir ===
The Rokan Hilir dialect is spoken in Rokan Hilir Regency in northern Riau, just across the border from North Sumatra. It is generally considered part of the 'o' variety of Riau Malay, as words that typically end in /a/ are pronounced as /o/. The dialect is regarded as a blend of the Riau Coastal and Rokan Hulu dialects, as it exhibits features from both. The dialect also has several sub-dialects that vary across districts, with differences typically found in grammar, phonology, and vocabulary.

=== Siak ===
The Siak dialect is spoken in both Siak Regency and the provincial capital of Riau, Pekanbaru. As Pekanbaru functions as a cultural melting pot in Riau, the Siak dialect spoken there has absorbed features from both coastal and inland varieties of Riau Malay. In Pekanbaru, this variety is recognized as a unifying language (bahasa persatuan) among its diverse communities. Siak Malay comprises two main dialects: the 'e' dialect and the 'o' dialect.

The 'e' dialect is regarded as a form of Classical Malay, exhibiting minimal differences from Classical or High Malay. It is considered the refined or formal variety of Siak Malay, historically spoken in and around the Siak Sri Indrapura Palace. Examples of this dialect in interrogative words include siape (who), kemane (where to), dimane (where), and beghape (how much).

In contrast, the 'o' dialect developed among the general population and serves as the vernacular for daily communication. Also known as bahaso Melayu Kampong (village Malay), this variety emerged in the villages surrounding the former administrative center of Siak Sri Indrapura. Today, the 'o' dialect is the most widely spoken form of Siak Malay. Following the relocation of Siak’s trading center to Pekanbaru, this dialect was carried by Siak merchants and became commonly used by communities along the Siak River.

=== Tembilahan ===
The Tembilahan dialect is spoken in Indragiri Hilir Regency in southeastern Riau, bordering Jambi. Tembilahan Malay is heavily influenced by the Banjar language, as many Banjar people from South Kalimantan have long migrated to and settled in Tembilahan and the surrounding areas. Many native Malays in Tembilahan are fluent in the Banjar language, and the same holds true for Banjar speakers. Code-mixing and code-switching between Tembilahan Malay and Banjar are common linguistic phenomena in the area. An example of Banjar influence on Tembilahan Malay is the significant number of Banjar loanwords that have been absorbed into the local variety. One notable example is the use of kinship terms in everyday greetings. Terms such as abah (father), uwak laki (uncle), and uwak bini (aunt) are borrowed from Banjar and commonly used in Tembilahan Malay.

== Literature ==
As heartlands of the Malay people, Riau boasts a rich tradition of Malay literature. The development of Malay literature in Riau dates back to the 1st century, when the Malay region served as a key stopover for traders from both the East and the West. This strategic location fostered the growth of a vibrant oral literary tradition (folklore) among the Malay people. The connection between the Malay people and Indian culture played a crucial role in the emergence of written Malay literature. Evidence of this relationship can be found in references to terms such as Javadvipa, Malayadvipa, and Karpuradvipa, with Survarnadvipa (the Island of Gold) or Suvarnabhumi (the Land of Gold) being the most commonly used, as documented in ancient Indian relics. Scholars have suggested that these terms likely referred to Sumatra, or perhaps both Sumatra and Java, or even as a collective name for the Malay Peninsula and the western islands of the Malay Archipelago.

In the early 17th century, tconflict between Malay rulers ended with a victory for the Sultanate of Aceh. During the reign of Sultan Iskandar Muda, the Aceh Sultanate expanded its influence over much of Sumatra, conquered Johor, and seized the kingdoms of Pahang, Perak, and Kedah on the Malay Peninsula. However, this dominance was short-lived. In 1640, the Sultanate of Johor managed to recover and restore its dominance over the Malay Peninsula. Thanks to its political alliances with various countries, including the Dutch and India, Johor became an influential sultanate in the Malacca Strait region. By the 18th century, however, Johor's power began to wane until it eventually fell under Dutch control. The form of Malay literature that developed during this period also began to change. When examining the gender of Malay literature influenced by Hindu-Buddhism, a shift is evident. Sanskrit praises, which had been commonly used, gradually fell out of favor and were replaced by Arabic. Nevertheless, hikayat (tales) from the Hindu-Buddhist era continued to be used alongside the growing body of hikayat derived from Arabic sources.

In Riau Malay culture, ungkapan (figurative expressions) hold an important place, as they often convey profound advice and teachings. These expressions are typically crafted with beautiful, symbolic language, rich in meaning and significance. They are commonly found in traditional Malay poetries such as pantun, syair, and gurindam. These poetries are usually expressed in traditional Riau Malay ceremonies such as weddings. Like many other traditional wedding ceremonies, Riau Malay weddings involve a series of ritual stages, each imbued with its own symbolic meanings. Given the deep connection between Malay life and the tradition of pantun and syair, it is unsurprising that these poetic forms feature prominently throughout the various stages of a traditional Malay wedding. Each pantun and syair conveys deep reflections and meanings, as seen in ceremonies such as berinai, berandam, mandi damai, and others. Furthermore, most pantun and syair performed during Riau Malay wedding ceremonies are filled with advice, moral teachings, and guidance, offering valuable lessons not only to the newlyweds but also to the wider Malay community.

In addition to its rich tradition of poetry, Riau is also renowned for its oral literatures such as folktales. These narratives, originating from the community, have evolved over time and are deeply embedded in the social fabric of society. They serve as a reflection of the traditions and cultural identity of a particular nation, city, or region, encapsulating the diverse cultural heritage and historical context of the community. Folktales often recount events tied to specific locations, thus giving rise to legends that explain the origins of these places. The protagonists in these tales are commonly human, animal, or divine figures. Folktales frequently portray extraordinary events and feature characters endowed with remarkable qualities. They fulfill a variety of roles, including serving as educational tools, providing comfort, offering avenues for social critique, and expressing unspoken desires. Moreover, folktales carry cultural values, conveying profound ideas, lofty ideals, and valuable life experiences. They also offer moral reflections on the nature of virtue and vice, as well as evoke emotions such as regret, compassion, and a heightened sense of humanity. Each region in Riau is home to its own unique folktales, contributing to the preservation and enrichment of the community’s cultural heritage.

== Writing system ==
Riau Malay has traditionally been written in the Jawi script, a modified form of the Arabic script, locally known as Arab-Melayu 'Arab-Malay'. In the past, the Jawi script was widely used in Riau and the surrounding regions, particularly by various Malay kingdoms and sultanates. This is reflected in the ongoing use of Jawi today. The development of the Jawi script in the Malay Archipelago was deeply influenced by the legacy of the Johor-Riau Sultanate, which played a significant role in producing numerous works in this script, earning recognition as its origin. Additionally, geographical factors, such as the proximity to Singapore, facilitated the publication of written works in the Jawi script. By the 1890s, Singapore had emerged as a major publishing hub in Southeast Asia, producing significant works on Jawi grammar, such as Bustân al-Kâtibîn and Kitab Pengetahuan Bahasa by Raja Ali Haji. In the broader community, especially in Bengkalis, both standard Arabic and the Jawi script were commonly used. Arabic was primarily employed in religious practices due to its association with Islam, while Jawi was widely utilized in education and classical manuscripts. The Jawi script has been a vital means of communication for over 400 years, particularly in correspondence between the rulers of the Malay Archipelago and their counterparts, including nobility and merchants from overseas.

The use of the Jawi script significantly declined with the introduction of the Latin script, a change brought about by European colonization. After Indonesia gained independence, the promotion of standard Indonesian, written in the Latin script, was actively encouraged in schools and institutions. However, in recent years, there has been a growing interest in preserving the Jawi script in Riau. Following the fall of Suharto in 1998, regional autonomy policies enacted by the Indonesian government granted special recognition to the Jawi script. This conscious effort to revive it has been reflected in various media, extending to schools and government offices. In Riau, the teaching of the Jawi script has been made a compulsory at the elementary and junior high school levels as part of the regional language subject. Some universities in Riau also offer courses dedicated to the study of the Jawi script. Additionally, Jawi is informally used alongside the Latin script, especially for cultural purposes such as road signs and government office signs. This phenomenon has naturally led to the need for the preparation and facilitation of Jawi textbooks and supporting media. Currently, the Riau Malay Cultural Council, established in 1970, actively promotes Riau Malay culture and the preservation of the Jawi script. Its efforts include publishing textbooks written in the Jawi script and organizing school curricula that focus on Riau Malay culture as well as the study of the Jawi script.

== See also ==
- Jambi Malay
- Malays (ethnic group)
- Minangkabau language

== Bibliography ==
- Dahlan, Saidat; Syair, Anwar; Manan, Abdullah; Sabrin, Amrin (1985). Pemetaan Bahasa Daerah Riau dan Jambi [Mapping of the Regional Languages in Riau and Jambi] (in Indonesian). Jakarta: Agency for Language Development and Cultivation.
- Dahlan, Saidat; Ramli, Bustami; Martono, Sugiyo Hadi; Sulaiman, Abubakar; Syafrial (1989). Geografi Dialek Bahasa Melayu Riau Kepulauan [Geography of the Riau Islands Malay Dialect] (in Indonesian). Jakarta: Agency for Language Development and Cultivation. ISBN 979-459-050-9.
- Dahlan, Saidat; R., M. Yunus; Manan, Abdullah (1990). Struktur Bahasa Melayu Riau Dialek Pasar Pangaraian [Structure of the Pasar Pangaraian Riau Malay Dialect] (in Indonesian). Jakarta: Agency for Language Development and Cultivation. ISBN 979-459-066-5.
- Dahlan, Saidat; Ramli, Bustami; Razak, Abdul; Zainal, Asni; Bahri, Syamsul (1991). Struktur Bahasa Melayu Riau Dialek Pesisir [Structure of the Coastal Riau Malay Language] (in Indonesian). Jakarta: Agency for Language Development and Cultivation. ISBN 979-459-104-1.
- Lubis, H. Idrus; Malik, Abdul; Gani, A.; Tobing, Basa Uli; Nurbaiti (1990). Morfosintaksis Bahasa Melayu Riau [Morphosyntax of Riau Malay] (in Indonesian). Jakarta: Agency for Language Development and Cultivation. ISBN 979-459-073-8.
- Lubis, H. Idrus; Sulaiman, Abubakar; Umar, Said Mahmud; Sinaga, Shanty; Isnaini Leo (1993). Tata Bahasa Melayu Riau [Grammar Structure of Riau Malay] (in Indonesian). Jakarta: Agency for Language Development and Cultivation. ISBN 979-459-300-1.
- Ruswan; Ras, Fakhri; Almadani, Latifah; Mukhlis (1990). Morfologi Nomina Adjektiva Bahasa Melayu Riau [Morphology of Adjectival Nouns in Riau Malay] (in Indonesian). Jakarta: Agency for Language Development and Cultivation. ISBN 979-459-075-4.
- Sulaiman, Abu Bakar; Gani, A.; K., Syafri (1986). Kosa Kata Bahasa Melayu Riau [Lexicons of Riau Malay] (in Indonesian). Jakarta: Agency for Language Development and Cultivation.
