= List of regencies and cities in Riau =

This is a list of regencies and cities in Riau province. As of October 2019, there were 10 regencies and 2 cities.

No.	Regency/ City	Capital	Regent/ Mayor	Area (km^{2})	Population (2019)	District	Kelurahan (urban village)/ Desa (village)	Logo	Location map
1	Bengkalis Regency	Bengkalis	Bustami HY	6.975,41	544.144	11	19/136		
2	Indragiri Hilir Regency	Tembilahan	M. Wardan	12.614,78	622.281	20	39/197		
3	Indragiri Hulu Regency	Rengat	Yopie Arianto	7.723,80	464.076	14	16/178		
4	Kampar Regency	Bangkinang	Catur Sugeng Susanto	10.983,47	748.956	21	8/242		
5	Kepulauan Meranti Regency	Selatpanjang	Irwan Nasir	3.707,84	208.580	9	5/96		
6	Kuantan Singingi Regency	Taluk Kuantan	Mursini	5.259,36	330.966	15	11/218		
7	Pelalawan Regency	Pangkalan Kerinci	M. Harris	12.758,45	369.048	12	14/104		
8	Rokan Hilir Regency	Bagansiapiapi	Suyatno	8.881,59	638.679	15	25/159		
9	Rokan Hulu Regency	Pasir Pengaraian	Sukiman	7.588,13	556.199	16	6/139		
10	Siak Regency	Siak Sri Indrapura	Alfedri	8.275,18	422.869	14	9/122		
11	Dumai	-	Zulkifli AS	1.623,38	288.741	7	33/-		
12	Pekanbaru	-	Firdaus	632,27	915.866	12	83/-		
