= Kuantan language =

Malayic language of Riau, Indonesia

Kuantan
- Rantau Kuantan
- Bahaso Kuantan بهاسو كوانتان
- Pronunciation: [ba.ha.so ku.an.tan]
- Native to: Indonesia (Riau)
- Region: Kuantan Singingi Regency
- Ethnicity: Kuantan
- Native speakers: (114,261 cited 1980)
- Language family: Austronesian: Malayo-Polynesian; disputed: Malayo-Sumbawan or Greater North Borneo; Malayic; Minangkabau (disputed); Kuantan
- Dialects: Baserah; Cerenti; Lubuk Jambi; Taluk Kuantan
- Writing system: Latin (Indonesian alphabet); Jawi

Language codes
- ISO 639-3: –
- Glottolog: None
- Regencies and cities in Riau where the Kuantan language is spoken by the majority of the population

The Kuantan language (Kuantan: Bahaso Kuantan, Jawi: بهاسو كوانتان), also known as Rantau Kuantan, is a Malayic language primarily spoken by the Kuantan people, a subgroup of the Minangkabau people residing in Kuantan Singingi Regency, southwestern Riau, Indonesia. The classification of this language is disputed, with some considering it a dialect of Riau Malay and others of Minangkabau, due to its similarity to the Minangkabau spoken in neighboring West Sumatra. The Minangkabau community classifies Kuantan as a dialect of Minangkabau, while the vast majority of Kuantan speakers reject this and instead consider it a dialect of Riau Malay. Indonesia’s Agency for Language Development and Cultivation, under the Ministry of Primary and Secondary Education, officially categorizes Kuantan as a Minangkabau dialect spoken in Riau, though its classification is inconsistent, as it is also sometimes listed as a Malay dialect. Nevertheless, the language bears a strong resemblance to Minangkabau, particularly in its phonology, grammar, and lexicon, and remains mutually intelligible with certain Minangkabau dialects.

The Kuantan language is an integral part of daily communication among the Kuantan people. It is also used in religious sermons, engagement ceremonies, and weddings, where traditional customs are expressed in the language. Alongside Kuantan, Indonesian, the national language, is widely spoken within the Kuantan community. Indonesian is the primary language in official settings, such as government institutions and schools. Most Kuantan people are bilingual in both Kuantan and Indonesian, using the latter as a lingua franca when communicating with non-Kuantan speakers. In semi-formal settings, such as markets, Kuantan people commonly engage in code-switching and code-mixing between Kuantan and Indonesian during conversations. Even in schools, where Indonesian is the primary language of instruction, students often code-switch and code-mix between Kuantan and Indonesian when communicating with their peers and even with teachers.

== Classification ==
The classification of the Kuantan language remains disputed; however, it is generally recognized as a Malayic language. Speakers of Malayic languages are spread from Brunei, Indonesia, Malaysia, Singapore, Southern Thailand, to the southernmost part of the Philippines. Malay is a member of the Austronesian family of languages, which includes languages from Taiwan, Southeast Asia, and the Pacific Ocean, with a smaller number in continental Asia. Malagasy, a geographic outlier spoken in Madagascar in the Indian Ocean, is also a member of this language family. Although these languages are not necessarily mutually intelligible to any extent, their similarities are often quite apparent. In more conservative languages like Malay, many roots have come with relatively little change from their common ancestor, Proto-Austronesian. There are many cognates found in the languages' words for kinship, health, body parts and common animals. Numbers, especially, show remarkable similarities.

The status of the Kuantan language remains a subject of debate. Most studies classify it as either a dialect of Riau Malay or Minangkabau. While the Minangkabau community considers the Kampar language a dialect of Minangkabau, this view is contested by most Kuantan speakers, who assert that it is a dialect of Malay. The Indonesian government's classification of the Kuantan language is also inconsistent, sometimes labeling it as a dialect of either Minangkabau or Riau Malay. For example, in the book Struktur Bahasa Melayu Dialek Kuantan 'Structure of the Kuantan Malay Dialect', the Agency for Language Development and Cultivation, under the Ministry of Primary and Secondary Education, classifies it as a dialect of Malay. Many studies and research also classifies the Kuantan language as a dialect of Riau Malay. Hamidy (2002) for example identified six dialects of Riau Malay, distinguished primarily by intonation and lexical differences:

- Dialect of isolated communities
- Petalangan
- Rokan
- Rantau Kuantan
- Kampar
- Riau Coastal

However, many studies and censuses also classify the Kuantan language as a dialect of Minangkabau. For example, the 1930 Dutch-era census categorized the Koeantanners as Minangkabau. Additionally, the 2017 book Bahasa dan Peta Bahasa di Indonesia (Languages and Language Maps in Indonesia), also published by the Agency for Language Development and Cultivation, classifies Kuantan as a Minangkabau dialect. According to the book, Kuantan is one of several Minangkabau dialects spoken in Riau, alongside Rokan, Basilam, Indragiri, and Kampar. To this day, some studies continue to classify Kuantan as a dialect of Minangkabau.

Regardless of its classification, the language spoken by the people of Kuantan Singingi Regency closely resembles Minangkabau spoken in neighboring West Sumatra. There are no communication barriers between Minangkabau speakers and the people of Kuantan Singingi, as both groups continue to maintain their respective linguistic identities in daily life. Although the languages of these two communities, now separated by provincial boundaries, exhibit differences in phonology, morphology, and syntax, they remain highly mutually intelligible. These differences do not compel either group to alter their accent or dialect when interacting. In fact, some dialectal variations of the Kuantan language are identical or strikingly similar to certain Minangkabau dialects.

== Geographic distribution and usage ==
The Kuantan language is primarily spoken in Kuantan Singingi Regency in southwestern Riau, near the border with West Sumatra. In Kuantan Singingi, most of the local community uses the Kuantan language for daily communication. The Kuantan language is also used in religious teachings, engagement ceremonies, and weddings. Their customary laws are conveyed in the Kuantan language. The Kuantan language also plays a vital role in preserving and promoting oral literature. As in other parts of Indonesia, oral traditions are deeply rooted in the Kuantan region, where proverbs and wise sayings have flourished. In traditional ceremonies, these are conveyed through poetic exchanges and proverbial expressions, with the Kuantan language playing a central role. The most prominent art form is kayat, a style of singing accompanied by drums or tambourines, both traditional musical instruments of the Kuantan region. Kayat is performed during circumcision ceremonies, wedding celebrations, and pacu jalur festivals. Another traditional Kuantan art form is rarak, which features celempong, drums, and gongs. During these ceremonies, Kuantan speakers would usually use a more literary variant of the language instead of the everyday colloquial form.

Most people in Kuantan are bilingual, speaking both Kuantan and Indonesian. Many migrants who have settled in Kuantan have also become fluent in the Kuantan language, although the variety they speak is generally more influenced by Indonesian. When interacting with other ethnic groups, the Kuantan people mostly use Indonesian, the national language and lingua franca, as a means of communication. Indonesian is the preferred language in official settings, such as government institutions and schools, while the Kuantan language is more commonly used in informal and semi-formal contexts. The Kuantan language is generally not used as the main language of instruction in schools; instead, Indonesian is used as the medium of instruction. Despite this, students often code-switch or code-mix between Indonesian and Kuantan in schools, particularly when speaking with friends or even teachers. A similar phenomenon can be observed in the market, where traders frequently code-switch between Kuantan and Indonesian when conversing with buyers. Due to the growing use of Indonesian in the region, it is becoming increasingly common for the Kuantan people to code-mix between Indonesian and Kuantan, even during traditional Kuantan ceremonies.

== Dialects ==
The Kuantan language has several dialects, with four major ones: Baserah, spoken in the Kuantan Hilir, Kuantan Hilir Seberang, Pangean and Logas Tanah Darat. Cerenti, spoken in Cerenti and Inuman. Lubuk Jambi, spoken in the Kuantan Mudik, Hulu Kuantan, Pucuk Rantau and Gunung Toar and Taluk Kuantan, spoken in the Kuantan Tengah, Sentajo Raya and Benai. The Taluk Kuantan dialect is considered the prestige dialect, as it is spoken in the regency capital of Kuantan Singingi. Each of these dialects has its own subdialects, which may exhibit slight variations in lexicon and phonology The phonological system of the dialects and isolects in Kuantan Singingi Regency is highly diverse. This is evident in the varied use of allophones or sound variants for a phoneme, which are consistently realized differently across isolects. For example, one notable phonological difference is that some dialects use the vowel /e/, while others use /ɛ/ as an alternative realization of /e/. However, these dialects are generally mutually intelligible, and most Kuantan speakers can understand one another, even when speaking different dialects. Below are some lexical and phonological differences of some words across the various Kuantan dialects, along with the Indonesian and English translation:

Standard Indonesian	Taluk Kuantan	Lubuk Jambi	Baserah	Cerenti
saya 'I'	deyen, ambo, den	ambo	deyen, ambo	den, ambo
dia 'he/she'	onyo, nyo, nye	inyo	enyo	enyo
itu 'that'	iten	itan	itu	eten
rumah 'house'	ruma	ruma	rumah	ruma
bulan 'moon'	bulan	bulan	bulen	bulan
rusa 'deer'	ruso	kuso	ruso	kuso
sepuluh ribu 'ten thousand'	sapulua ribu	sapulua kibu	sapulua ribu	sapulua kibu
ayam 'chicken'	anyam	ayam	ayom	ayem
celana 'pants'	salowar	lewou	salowe	salowe

== Phonology ==
The Kuantan language, like many other regional languages in Indonesia, lacks a standardized phonological system. Nevertheless, many of the phonological system designed for the Kuantan language is loosely based on standard Indonesian orthography, especially the system created by the Indonesian Ministry of Education, Culture, Research, and Technology.

=== Vowels ===
The Kuantan language has six vowels. These vowels are /i/, /e/, /ə/, /a/, /u/, and /o/. Some dialects of Kuantan also use the vowel /ɛ/ instead of /e/.

	Front	Central	Back
Close	i		u
Mid	e	ə	o
Open		a	

Notes:

- In writing, /e/ and /ə/ are both represented as ⟨e⟩.

=== Consonants ===
The Kuantan language has 18 consonants.

		Labial	Alveolar	Postalveolar	Palatal	Velar	Glottal
Nasal		m	n	ɲ		ŋ	
Plosive/ Affricate	voiceless	p	t	t͡ʃ		k	ʔ
Plosive/ Affricate	voiced	b	d	d͡ʒ		ɡ	
Fricative	voiceless		s				
Fricative	voiced						
Approximant		w	l		j		
Trill			r				

Notes:

- In writing, the following phonemes are represented as thus:
  - /ŋ/ is ⟨ng⟩
  - /ɲ/ is ⟨ny⟩
  - /t͡ʃ/ is ⟨c⟩
  - /d͡ʒ/ is ⟨j⟩
  - /ʔ/ is ⟨k⟩
  - /j/ is ⟨y⟩

=== Diphthongs ===
The Kuantan language has a total of 10 diphthongs, which are used as follows:

Diphthongs	Middle	Ending
/ua/	buruak 'bad'	cilua 'stupid'
/ue/	buek 'to make'	kue 'cake'
/uo/	suok 'to feed'	tuo 'old'
/oi/		poi 'to go'
/ai/	main 'to play'	corai 'divorce'
/ae/	laek 'very'	
/ia/	biliak 'room'	pilia 'to choose'
/ie/	liek 'to see'	
/io/		rabio 'sago palm'
/ea/	leak 'soft'	

== Grammar ==
Along with Minangkabau, Indonesian, Malay, and other related languages, the word order in the Kuantan language is typically subject-verb-object (SVO). While there are notable exceptions, the grammar structure of the Kuantan language shares many similarities with Indonesian and Malay.

=== Affixes ===
Similar to other Malayic languages, there are affixes in the Kuantan language. There are four types of affixes in the Kuantan language: prefixes, suffixes, infixes, and circumfixes. The table below provides examples of affixes used in the Kuantan language, along with their allomorphs, meanings, and usage:

Type of affixes	Affixes	Allomorphs	Functions and meanings	Example of basic word	Example of derived word
Prefixes	ma-	man-, mang- many-, mam-,	Used to form active verbs. It conveys the meaning of ‘performing the action expressed by the base word' the base word is a verb, ‘making what is expressed by the base word', ‘placing or applying what is expressed by the base word', ‘using what is expressed by the base word', ‘using, playing, or displaying what is expressed by the base word', ‘heading toward or going through what is expressed by the base word', ‘eating, inhaling, or drinking what is expressed by the base word', or ‘seeking or collecting what is expressed by the base word' if the base word is a noun, ‘making or becoming what is expressed by the base word' if the base word is an adjective, ‘becoming’ or ‘commemorating' if the base word is a numeral, and ‘saying what is expressed by the base word' if the base word is a pronoun.	kopi 'coffee'	mangopi 'to have a coffee'
Prefixes	di-	none	Used to form passive verbs. It conveys the meaning of ‘expressing intentionality’ or ‘indicating that something is in progress' if the base word is an active verb.	makan 'to eat'	dimakan 'to be eaten'
Prefixes	ta-	none	Used to form passive verbs. It conveys the meaning of ‘unintentional action,’ ‘performing the activity expressed by the base word,’ or ‘most’ if the base word is an active verb.	rancak 'pretty'	tarancak 'prettiest'
Prefixes	pa-	pan-, pang-, pany-, pam-	Used to form nouns or verbs. It conveys the meaning of ‘a person who frequently enjoys performing the activity expressed by the base word’, ‘a tool for performing the activity', or ‘a measure (size, distance, area) as expressed by the base word’ if the base word is a verb and ‘a person who has the characteristic expressed by the base form’ or ‘enhancing the quality expressed by the base form’ if the base word is an adjective.	tiduar 'to sleep'	paniduar 'sleepy head'
Prefixes	ba-	none	Used to form intransitive verbs. It conveys the meaning of ‘making, becoming, having, or using’ if the base word is a noun and ‘performing the action expressed by the base word’ if the base word is a verb.	musua 'enemy'	bamusua 'to become enemy'
Prefixes	sa-	none	The prefix sa- can be attached to verbs, adjectives, prepositions, and nouns. Its core meaning is ‘one.’ From this core meaning, its usage expands to convey different nuances: ‘the entire content’ when the base word is a noun, ‘in accordance with’ or ‘after’ when the base word is a verb, and ‘the same as’ or ‘intensifying the meaning’ when the base word is an adjective.	kampuang 'village'	sakampuang 'the whole village'
Suffixes	-an	none	Used to form nouns. It conveys the meaning of ‘the result of an action being performed as expressed by the base word’. or ‘the result of an action being received as expressed by the base word’, ‘a place associated with what is expressed by the base word’, or ‘something that can undergo the action expressed by the base word’. (i.e., something affected by what is expressed by the base word), or ‘a tool used to perform the action expressed by the base word’. if the base word is a verb. If the base word is an adjective, it means ‘something that possesses the stated quality’.	pakai 'wear'	pakaian 'clothes'
Suffixes	-i	none	Used to form imperative verbs. It conveys the meaning of expressing an action if the base word is a verb.	pogang 'to hold'	pongangi 'to hold something'
Infixes	-al-	none	These infixes form new words that do not differ in part of speech from the base form. They convey the meaning of 'many and various' or 'the one who performs' if the base word is a noun, and indicate intensity if the base word is an adjective.	torang 'bright'	tamorang 'very bright'
Infixes	-am-	none	These infixes form new words that do not differ in part of speech from the base form. They convey the meaning of 'many and various' or 'the one who performs' if the base word is a noun, and indicate intensity if the base word is an adjective.	tali 'rope'	tamali 'many ropes'
Circumfixes	ka-...-an	none	Used to form nouns. It conveys the meaning of an event or occurrence if the base word is a verb, forming an abstract noun that refers to something related to the base word if the base word is an adjective, and a collection or group that results from what is expressed by the base word if the base word is a numeral.	barani 'brave'	kabaranian 'bravery'
Circumfixes	pa-...-an	pan-, pang-, pany-, pam-	Used to form nouns. It conveys the meaning of indicating a place to perform the action expressed by the base word if the base word is a noun or verb, and expressing the act of doing what is stated by the base word if the base word is a verb or adjective.	labua 'to dock'	palabuan 'port'

=== Reduplication ===
As in other Malayic languages, the Kuantan language uses reduplication. Reduplication in the Kuantan language can occur through full reduplication of the base form or reduplication with affixation.

Full reduplication involves the complete repetition of the base form. When the base form is a noun, it indicates plurality. When it is a verb, it expresses an action done carelessly. When it is an adjective, it conveys intensity. When it is a numeral, it signifies a collective group. Reduplication with affixation occurs in verbs, adjectives, and numerals, and its function is closely tied to the grammatical category of the base form. In verbs, it indicates a continuous action and can also express reciprocity. In adjectives, it conveys a superlative meaning. In numerals, it signifies the entirety of what is represented by the base form.

Examples of full reduplication are shown below:

- sayuar 'vegetable' → sayuar-sayuar 'many vegetables'
- lari 'to run' → lari-lari 'to run around carelessly'
- ketek 'small' → ketek-ketek 'small things'
- duo 'two' → duo-duo 'groups of two'

Examples of affixed reduplication are shown below:

- ganti 'to change' → baganti-ganti 'to change multiple times'
- dokek 'close' → badokek-dokek 'to be close to each other'
- putia 'white' → saputia-putianyo 'as white as possible'
- limo 'five' → kalimo-limonyo 'all five'

=== Nouns ===
Nouns in the Kuantan language consist of basic nouns and affixed nouns. Basic nouns stand alone and are not derived from other words. Affixed nouns, on the other hand, are formed by adding prefixes, suffixes, or circumfixes to words from different classes, such as verbs or adjectives. These affixes modify the meaning of the root word, allowing for the creation of new nouns with specific meanings.

Examples of basic nouns are shown below:

- bosi 'iron'
- mato 'eye'
- muko 'face'
- toluar 'egg'

Examples of affixed nouns are shown below:

- makan 'to eat' + -an → makanan 'food'
- main 'to play' + -an → mainan 'toy'
- pa- + torang 'bright' + -an → panorangan 'lighting'
- ke- + bodo 'stupid' + -an → kebodoan 'stupidity'

=== Verbs ===
Verbs in the Kuantan language also consist of basic verbs and affixed verbs. Basic verbs stand alone and do not require additional elements. Affixed verbs, on the other hand, are formed by adding affixes to words from different classes, such as nouns or adjectives, to create new verb forms. Common affixes used to form verbs in Kuantan include ma-, di-, ta-, pa-, ba-, and -i. Verbs can also be divided into transitive verbs and intransitive verbs.

Examples of basic verbs are shown below:

- jalan 'to walk'
- jumpo 'to meet'
- gantuang 'to hang'
- bao 'to bring'

Examples of affixed verbs are shown below:

- pa- + lebar 'wide' → palebar 'to widen'
- ba- + kawan 'friend' → bakawan 'to become friends'
- di- + sayang 'to love' + -i → disayangi 'to be loved'
- ka- + tiduar 'to sleep' + -an → katiduaran 'to fell asleep by accident'

=== Adjectives ===
In the Kuantan language, adjectives can be modified with intensifiers like bonar ‘very’. Examples of adjectives are shown below:

- rancak 'pretty'
- panjang 'long'
- ronda 'low'
- godang 'big'

=== Numerals ===
In the Kuantan language, numerals are typically followed by classifiers. The following are examples:

- sabua toluar 'an egg'
- limo bua pisang 'five bananas'
- duo ikuar ikan 'two fishes'
- sapucuak surek 'a letter'

== Vocabulary ==
Much of the vocabulary in the Kuantan language is derived from Minangkabau. Although there are some variations compared to the Minangkabau spoken in West Sumatra, speakers of both languages can still understand each other due to their shared vocabulary. Due to Indonesian's status as the national and official language of education, the Kuantan language has increasingly absorbed loanwords from Indonesian, similar to other regional languages across Indonesia. This has led to code-mixing, where Indonesian and Kuantan words are used together in conversation depending on the context. However, the growing influence of Indonesian poses a threat, as many traditional Kuantan words are gradually being replaced by their Indonesian equivalents. The table below provides examples of common Kuantan vocabulary used on a daily basis along with their standard Minangkabau, Indonesian, and English equivalents.

=== Numerals ===
Number	Kuantan	Minangkabau	Indonesian	English
1	ciek, oso	ciek, satu, aso	satu	one
2	duo	duo	dua	two
3	tigo	tigo	tiga	three
4	ompek	ampek	empat	four
5	limo	limo	lima	five
6	onam	anam	enam	six
7	tujua	tujuah	tujuh	seven
8	lapan	lapan	delapan	eight
9	sambilan	sambilan	sembilan	nine
10	sapulua	sapuluah	sepuluh	ten
11	sabole	sabaleh	sebelas	eleven
20	duo pulua	duo puluah	dua puluh	twenty
50	limo pulua	limo puluah	lima puluh	fifty
100	saratui	saratuih	seratus	one hundred
500	limo ratui	limo ratuih	lima ratus	five hundred
1000	saribu	saribu	seribu	one thousand
5000	limo ribu	limo ribu	lima ribu	five thousand
100,000	saratui ribu	saratuih ribu	seratus ribu	one hundred thousand
1,000,000	sajuta, salaso	sajuta	sejuta, satu juta	one million

=== Directions ===
Kuantan	Minangkabau	Indonesian	English
iko	iko	ini	this
itu	itu	itu	that
siko	siko	sini	here
sinan, situ	sinan	situ	there (close)
sinan, keen, kien	sinan	sana	there (far)
disiko	disiko	disini	over here
disinan, disitu	disinan	disitu	over there (close)
disinan	disinan	disana	over there (far)
ate	ateh	atas	up
bawa	bawah	bawah	down
utaro	utaro	utara	north
salatan	salatan	selatan	south
timuar	timur	timur	east
barat	barat, baraik	barat	west

=== Personal Pronouns ===
Kuantan	Minangkabau	Indonesian	English
ambo, den, deyen	ambo, awak, aden	aku, saya	I, me
kau, awak, tuan, aang	ang, waang, awak, kau	kamu, engkau	you (informal)
kalian	kalian	kalian	you (prural)
onyo, nyo, enyo, inyo	inyo, wakno, ano	dia	he/she
kami, awak	awak, kami	kami	we (exclusive)
kito, awak	kito	kita	we (inclusive)
rang di	urang-urang, urang tu	mereka	they/them

=== Interrogatives Pronouns ===
Kuantan	Minangkabau	Indonesian	English
sapo, siapo	sia, siapo	siapa	who
apo	a, apo	apa	what
mangapo	mangapo, manga, dek a	kenapa, mengapa	why
dimano	dimano, dima	mana, dimana	where
bilo	bilo	kapan	when
baapo	bagaimano, ba a	gimana, bagaimana	how
barapo	bara	berapa	how much
bilo, kalau	bilo, pabilo, kalau	bila, apabila, kalau	if

=== Nouns ===
Kuantan	Minangkabau	Indonesian	English
ayier	aie, aia	air	water
batang	pohon	pohon	tree
sungai	sungai, sei, batang aia	sungai	river
lauik	lauik	laut	sea
pantai	pantai	pantai	beach
laki, jantan	lalaki	pria, laki-laki	man
batino	padusi	wanita, perempuan	woman
tana	tanah	tanah	land, ground, soil
gunuang	gunuang	gunung	mountain
pasier	pasia	pasir	sand
jalan	jalan	jalan	road
kudo	kudo	kuda	horse
manso, kondiak	babi	babi	pig
anjiang	anjiang	anjing	dog
ikan, lauak	ikan, lauak	ikan	fish
anak	anak	anak	child, kid
bungo	bungo	bunga	flower
daun	daun	daun	leaf
kulik	kulik	kulit	skin
ikuar	ikua	ekor	tail
talingo	talingo	telinga	ear
kapalo	kapalo	kepala	head
lihiar	lihia, lihie	leher	neck
ati	ati	hati	heart
muncuang	muluik, muncuang	mulut	mouth
iduang	iduang	hidung	nose
obuak	abuak, rambuik	rambut	hair
balobek	jandela	jendela	window
pintu	pintu	pintu	door
atok	atok	atap	roof

=== Verbs ===
Kuantan	Minangkabau	Indonesian	English
makan	makan, sungkah	makan	eat
minum	minum, minun	minum	drink
lari, kojar	lari	lari	run
cakap, kecek, cakok	kecek	bicara	to talk
masak	masak	masak	to cook
masuak	masuak	masuk	to enter
kaluar	kalua	keluar	to exit
togak	tagak, badiri	berdiri	to stand
duduak	duduak	duduk	to sit
tarobang	tabang	terbang	to fly
liek, tengok, pandang, coliak	liek, caliak	lihat, tengok	see
bayiwer	baia	bayar	pay
bamain	bamain	bermain	to play
ambiak	ambiak	ambil	take
boli	bali	beli	buy
jual	jua	jual	sell
logu, dendang, nandong	lagu, nyanyi	nyanyi	to sing
tiduar	lalok, tidua	tidur	to sleep
tibo	tibo	tiba	to arrive
poi	pai	pergi	to go
bori, kasia	bari	beri, kasih	to give
dongar	danga	dengar	to listen
omua	amuah	mau	to want

=== Adjectives ===
Kuantan	Minangkabau	Indonesian	English
kayo	kayo	kaya	rich
rancak	rancak	bagus, baik	good
buruak	buruak	buruk	bad
pandai	pandai	pandai	smart
cilua	ongok, pakak, tea	bodoh	stupid
sonang	sanang	senang	happy
sodia, ibo, ebo, duko	rusuah, sadiah	sedih	sad
bosar, godang	gadang	besar, gede	big, large
ketek, kenek	ketek, kaciak	kecil	small
panjang	panjang	panjang	long
pendek	pendek	pendek	short
tenggi	tinggi	tinggi	tall
bulek	bulek	bundar	round
pane, angek	paneh, angek	panas	hot
dingin, sojuak	dingin, sajuak	dingin, sejuk	cold
mania	manih, kamek	manis	sweet
torang	tarang	terang	bright
golo	kalam	gelap	dark
lowe	laweh	luas	wide
sompit	sampik	sempit	narrow
borek	barek	berat	heavy
koriang	kariang	kering	dry
baru	baru	baru	new
lamo	lamo	lama	long (time), old
copek	capek	cepat	quick
samo	samo	sama	same
sakik	sakik	sakit	sick
banyak	banyak, rami	banyak	many
seenek, sangenek, saketek	saketek	sedikit	little

== Writing system ==
Like other Malayic languages, the Kuantan language was historically written in Jawi, a modified form of the Arabic script locally known as Arab-Melayu 'Arab-Malay'. The Jawi script played a significant role in religious and cultural traditions in Kuantan Singingi, particularly in the writing of poetry and traditional stories. One notable example is Kayat, a traditional oral performance art of the Kuantan community that conveys folk tales through poetic forms such as pantun, syair, and rhythmic prose with strong Islamic influences. Originally written in Jawi, Kayat was later transcribed and reinterpreted by knowledgeable individuals or religious scholars skilled in chanting, reinforcing its association with both religious understanding and artistic appreciation. Jawi was also used for communication between traditional Malay kingdoms in Kuantan Singingi and traditional institutions (lembaga adat). For example, the Pagaruyung Kingdom in West Sumatra historically used the Jawi script to correspond with its protectorates in Kuantan. The use of Jawi declined significantly with the arrival of Dutch colonization, as the Latin script was introduced and gradually became dominant. This decline continued into the present day with the adoption of Indonesian as the official language and the primary medium of education, both of which are written in the Latin script.

== See also ==
- Kuantan Singingi Regency
- Minangkabau language
- Kampar language
- Mukomuko language
- Pesisir language
- Jamee language

== Bibliography ==
- Ruswan; M.S., Suwardi; Almadani, Latifah; S., Nursyam (1986). Struktur Bahasa Melayu Dialek Kuantan [Structure of the Kuantan Malay dialect] (PDF) (in Indonesian). Jakarta: Agency for Language Development and Cultivation.
- Saputra, Syahrial De (2007). Kebudayaan Perbatasan: Melayu Kuantan Singingi [Border Culture: The Malays of Kuantan Singingi] (in Indonesian). Tanjungpinang: Center for the Preservation of History and Traditional Values, Department of Culture and Tourism. ISBN 9789-7912-8114-0.
- Riswara, Yanti (2007), "Diasistem Lafal Silabe Akhir dalam Isolek-Isolek di Kabupaten Kuantan Singingi" [Final Syllable Pronunciation System in Isolects of Kuantan Singingi Regency], Bunga Rampai: Hasil Penelitian Bahasa dan Sastra (in Indonesian), Pekanbaru: Balai Bahasa Riau, pp. 201–230, ISBN 978-979-792-089-0
