= Kampar language =

Malayic language of Sumatra, Indonesia

Kampar
- Ocu
- Bahaso Kampau بهاسو كمڤاو
- Pronunciation: [ba.ha.so kam.paw] [ba.ha.so o.t͡ʃu]
- Native to: Indonesia (Riau)
- Region: Primarily spoken in Kampar. Also found in parts of Rokan Hilir, Rokan Hulu, Pekanbaru, Pelalawan, Kuantan Singingi, and Indragiri Hulu.
- Ethnicity: Kampar
- Native speakers: (100,000 cited 1978)
- Language family: Austronesian: Malayo-Polynesian; disputed: Malayo-Sumbawan or Greater North Borneo; Malayic-Minangkabauic; Minangkabau; Kampar
- Early form: Classical Kampar
- Dialects: Air Tiris; Bangkinang; Kuntu; Kuok; Tapung
- Writing system: Latin (Indonesian alphabet); Jawi

Language codes
- ISO 639-3: –
- Glottolog: None
- Regencies and cities in Riau where Kampar is spoken by the majority of the population

The Kampar language (Kampar: Bahaso Kampau, Jawi: بهاسو كمڤاو), locally known as Ocu (Kampar: Bahaso Ocu), is a Malayic language spoken mainly by the Kampar people, that resides in Kampar Regency, Riau, Indonesia. The linguistic classification of the Kampar language remains a topic of debate, as it is sometimes regarded as a dialect of either Riau Malay or Minangkabau. The Agency for Language Development and Cultivation under Indonesia's Ministry of Primary and Secondary Education officially categorizes Kampar as a Minangkabau dialect spoken in Riau. Similarly, the Minangkabau community considers the Kampar language to be a variant of Minangkabau due to its resemblance to the Limapuluh Kota dialect. However, this perspective is challenged by the Kampar community, where the majority assert that Kampar is a dialect of Riau Malay, distinct from Minangkabau.

In Kampar, like other regional languages in Indonesia, the Kampar language is primarily used for informal communication, with its formal usage mostly limited to traditional ceremonies and customary events. It is also influenced by other languages, particularly Indonesian, the national language, which is predominantly used in formal settings such as government institutions and schools. In addition, the influence of standard Minangkabau complicates the distinction between Kampar and the Minangkabau variety spoken in West Sumatra. For example, ompek in Kampar and ampek in Minangkabau both mean ‘four.’ Similarly, words such as inyo ‘he/she’, apo ‘what’, and tigo ‘three are shared by both languages with identical meanings. Most people in Kampar are bilingual in both Kampar and Indonesian, frequently engaging in code-switching and code-mixing between the two languages. The Kampar language is increasingly threatened by the growing use of Indonesian, leading to the gradual replacement of traditional Kampar vocabulary with Indonesian equivalents.

== Classification ==
The classification of the Kampar language remains disputed; however, it is generally recognized as a Malayic language. Speakers of Malayic languages are spread from Brunei, Indonesia, Malaysia, Singapore, Southern Thailand, to the southernmost part of the Philippines. Malay is a member of the Austronesian family of languages, which includes languages from Taiwan, Southeast Asia, and the Pacific Ocean, with a smaller number in continental Asia. Malagasy, a geographic outlier spoken in Madagascar in the Indian Ocean, is also a member of this language family. Although these languages are not necessarily mutually intelligible to any extent, their similarities are often quite apparent. In more conservative languages like Malay, many roots have come with relatively little change from their common ancestor, Proto-Austronesian. There are many cognates found in the languages' words for kinship, health, body parts and common animals. Numbers, especially, show remarkable similarities.

The linguistic classification of Kampar remains a subject of debate. At times, it is considered a dialect of either Riau Malay or Minangkabau. Kampar is a variety within the Malayic language family; however, it has yet to receive a widely accepted language code or internal classification within the Malayic group. The geographical distribution of Kampar, situated between the Minangkabau-speaking region to the west and the Riau Malay-speaking region to the east, has led to mutual linguistic influence between these languages, forming part of a dialect continuum in central Sumatra.

For its speakers, Kampar is referred to as Bahasa Ocu and is considered a variety of Riau Malay, distinct from Minangkabau. In various publications, it is alternatively labeled as Melayu Kampar 'Kampar Malay', Melayu dialek Kampar 'Kampar Malay dialect', or Melayu Riau dialek Kampar 'Kampar Riau Malay dialect'. However, other sources, such as the 1982 book Struktur Bahasa Minangkabau di Kabupaten Kampar published by the Indonesian Ministry of Education and Culture, provide a detailed grammatical description of Minangkabau as spoken in Kampar Regency, suggesting a strong linguistic connection to Minangkabau. Additionally, the 2017 book Bahasa dan Peta Bahasa di Indonesia, also published by the Ministry of Education and Culture, further supports the presence of Minangkabau in Kampar Regency, leading some publications to classify Kampar as Minang Kampar 'Kampar Minangkabau' or Minang dialek Kampar 'Kampar Minangkabau dialect'. Similarly, Masni et al. (2021) found in their study of the Kuntu isolex in Kampar Regency that its phonemic diversity aligns with Minangkabau dialects, despite its administrative location in Riau.

Hamidy (2002) identified six dialects of Riau Malay, distinguished primarily by intonation and lexical differences:

- Dialect of isolated communities
- Petalangan
- Rokan
- Rantau Kuantan
- Kampar
- Riau Coastal

In 2009, a language mapping team from the Riau Provincial Language Center classified Kampar (divided into Kampar and East Kampar dialects) as part of Melayu Darat ‘Inland Malay’, alongside the Kuantan and Rokan dialects.

Similarities between Kampar and Minangkabau, particularly with the Limapuluh Kota dialect, have led some scholars to classify Kampar as a dialect of Minangkabau. Said et al. (1986) stated that the language spoken in western Kampar Regency (which corresponds to the current Kampar Regency after separation of other regencies) is Minangkabau. The Indonesian Agency for Language Development and Cultivation also classifies the Kampar dialect as one of the Minangkabau dialects spoken in Riau, alongside Rokan, Basilam, Indragiri, and Kuantan dialects. The lexical difference between Kampar and other Minangkabau dialects ranges from 51% to 69%. Based on the classification theories of Guiter and Lauder, this percentage indicates that Kampar and Minangkabau are dialectally distinct but closely related languages.

== Geographic distribution and usage ==
The Kampar language is primarily spoken along the Kampar River in Kampar Regency, located in western Riau near the border with West Sumatra. It is also spoken in parts of Rokan Hilir, Rokan Hulu, Pekanbaru, Pelalawan, Kuantan Singingi, and Indragiri Hulu. The Kampar language is also spoken by descendants of Kampar migrants in Malaysia, particularly in Pahang, Perak, Selangor, and to some extent, Kedah. Between the 16th and 20th centuries, approximately eight waves of migration brought the Kampar people from present-day Kampar to the Malay Peninsula. Notable examples include Sultan Ali Alauddin Shah’s journey from Kampar to Pahang, where he established Pekan Tua before founding Johor Lama in 1540, the arrival of Sultan Muzaffar II of Johor in Perak from Kampar, where he was later crowned Sultan, and the migration of Kampar people to the Malay Peninsula as traders, among other movements. The Kampar language is still spoken as the mother tongue of the Kampar community in Malaysia, though it has developed distinct characteristics, particularly in terms of accent and influences from other languages, such as Malaysian Malay.

In Kampar, the Kampar language plays a vital role in the community's daily life, serving as the primary means of communication among its people. The Kampar language is also used to promote traditional Kampar ceremonies and oral literature. The use of this regional language fosters a strong sense of cultural identity, as it is intricately tied to the traditions and heritage of the Kampar community. Most members of the Kampar community are fluent in both Kampar and Indonesian, the national language. While Kampar is predominantly used in informal, everyday interactions, Indonesian is more widely used in formal settings, such as government and educational institutions. Indonesian also serves as a lingua franca for communication between Kampar residents and those from other regions. However, in certain situations, including some formal settings like schools, the use of the Kampar language is often preferred. It is also quite common for the people of Kampar to engage in code-switching and code-mixing between Kampar and Indonesian. The use of the Kampar language is currently under threat due to cultural acculturation and the growing influence of Indonesian, particularly among younger generations. Many traditional Kampar lexicons have fallen into disuse and are gradually being replaced by their Indonesian equivalents.

== Dialects and variants ==
The Kampar language has two variants: Classical Kampar and Modern Kampar. Classical Kampar, influenced by Classical Malay, was spoken from the 15th to the 19th century, primarily by the older generation born and raised in Kampar. This variant is considered more authentic and is easier to pronounce for the older speakers. In contrast, Modern Kampar has been in use since the 19th century and continues to be spoken today. It is primarily used by younger generations born in the 1990s and beyond, as well as by immigrants who were not born in Kampar. There are notable differences between the two variants, particularly in terms of phonology and vocabulary. Phonologically, Modern Kampar is easier to pronounce and more flexible. For example, the word buntagh meaning 'round' in Classical Kampar has evolved into bulek in Modern Kampar. The phonemes in Classical Kampar are more complex and harder to pronounce compared to those in Modern Kampar. In terms of vocabulary, Classical Kampar still retains many traditional vocabularies, with many words, such as those containing the "gh" phoneme, being difficult to pronounce. Additionally, Classical Kampar strongly reflects the local culture and still retains many traditional terms no longer used in Modern Kampar. On the other hand, Modern Kampar has been influenced by external languages, such as Indonesian, resulting in significant changes in vocabulary. The table below compares the vocabulary between Classical and Modern Kampar:

Classical Kampar	Modern Kampar	English
tayok	ambiok	to take
buntagh	bulek	round
salipe	tarompa	sandal
tukak	luko	wound
mamboka	mancora	to talk
komua	kini	currently
longko	malam tadi	last night
maelo	manegang	interesting
tutuyak	manyanya	angrily

In addition, the Kampar language encompasses various dialects and isolects, each with unique characteristics, particularly in phonology and vocabulary, that distinguish them from one another. For example, the Tapung dialect spoken in northern Kampar exhibits characteristics of the Riau Coastal Malay dialect, which is spoken in Siak and Bengkalis, due to the region's historical connection with the Siak Sultanate. There are also other dialects in the Kampar language, such as Air Tiris, Bangkinang, Kuntu, Kuok, and Tapung.

== Phonology ==
The Kampar language, like many other regional languages in Indonesia, lacks a standardized phonological system. Nevertheless, many of the phonological system designed for the Kampar language is loosely based on standard Indonesian orthography, especially the system created by the Indonesian Ministry of Education, Culture, Research, and Technology.

=== Vowels ===
The Kampar language has six vowels. These vowels are /i/, /e/, /ə/, /a/, /u/, and /o/. In contrast, standard Minangkabau lacks the vowel /ə/.

	Front	Central	Back
Close	i		u
Mid	e	ə	o
Open		a	

Notes:

- In writing, /e/ and /ə/ are both represented as ⟨e⟩.

=== Consonants ===
The Kampar language has 19 consonants. Kampar lacks the /r/ consonant found in standard Minangkabau, whereas standard Minangkabau lacks the consonant /ʁ/.

		Labial	Alveolar	Postalveolar	Palatal	Velar	Uvular	Glottal
Nasal		m	n	ɲ		ŋ		
Plosive/ Affricate	voiceless	p	t	t͡ʃ		k		ʔ
Plosive/ Affricate	voiced	b	d	d͡ʒ		ɡ		
Fricative	voiceless		s					h
Fricative	voiced						ʁ	
Approximant		w	l		j			

Notes:

- In writing, the following phonemes are represented as thus:
  - /ŋ/ is ⟨ng⟩
  - /ɲ/ is ⟨ny⟩
  - /t͡ʃ/ is ⟨c⟩
  - /d͡ʒ/ is ⟨j⟩
  - /ʔ/ is ⟨k⟩
  - /j/ is ⟨y⟩
  - /ʁ/ is ⟨gh⟩
- The phoneme /ʁ/ is realized differently across various dialects, with phonetic variations [r], [ʀ], and [ʁ]. This phoneme is commonly written as gh. For example, the word 'blood' in Kampar is translated as dagha and may be pronounced as [dara], [daʁa], or [daʀa].

=== Diphthongs ===
Diphthong phonemes in the Kampar language vary across subdialects or isolects. For example, the Kuntu isolect has 8 diphthongs: /io/, /ua̯/, /uj/, /aj/, /aw/, /ie̯/, /uo̯/, and /ow/. In contrast, the isolects of Bangkinang and Air Tiris have 7 diphthongs: /ia̯/, /ua̯/, /uj/, /oj/, /aj/, /iw/, and /aw/. Below are examples of diphthong usage:

Diphthongs	Middle	Ending
/io/	ambiok 'to take'	manusio 'human'
/uo/	masuok 'to enter'	jawuo 'far'
/uj/	kabuik 'fog'	potui 'thunder'
/oj/	moik 'corpse'	
/aj/	sampaian 'to inform'	coghai 'divorce'
/iw/		kambiu 'coconut'
/aw/		pagau 'fence'
/ie̯/	sisiek 'scale'	kambie̯ 'coconut'
/ow/		bonou 'correct'

== Grammar ==
Along with Minangkabau, Indonesian, Malay, and other related languages, the word order in the Kampar language is typically subject-verb-object (SVO). While there are notable exceptions, the grammar structure of the Kampar language shares many similarities with Indonesian and Malay.

=== Affixes ===
Similar to other Malayic languages, the Kampar language features affixes. There are four types of affixes in Kampar: prefixes, suffixes, infixes, and circumfixes. The table below provides examples of affixes used in Kampar, along with their allomorphs, meanings, and usage:

Type of affixes	Affixes	Allomorphs	Functions and meanings	Example of basic word	Example of derived word
Prefixes	ba-	bar-, bal-	Used to form intransitive verbs. It conveys the meaning of having or possessing what is described by the root word, wearing or putting on what is mentioned in the root word, riding or traveling in what is referred to by the root word, producing or giving birth to what is stated in the root word, containing or holding what is described by the root word, engaging in or working with what is mentioned in the root word as an occupation, calling, addressing, or referring to a person as stated in the root word, performing an action or activity as described by the root word, experiencing, feeling, or being in a state as indicated by the root word, or a group or collection consisting of the number specified in the root word.	adiok 'younger sibling'	baradiok 'to have a younger sibling'
Prefixes	di-	none	Used to form passive verbs. The meaning derived from its affixation is the inverse of that of a transitive active verb.	buek 'to make'	dibuek 'to be made'
Prefixes	ka-	none	Used to form numerals that indicate rank or group. Also can be used to form nouns or adjectives. This prefix does not carry a specific meaning in the sentence.	duo 'two'	kaduo 'second'
Prefixes	maN-	ma-, mam-, man-, mang-, many-	Used to form either transitive or intransitive active verbs. It conveys the meaning of performing an action as described by the root word, carrying out an activity using the tool mentioned in the root word, producing an item referred to by the root word, working with a material specified in the root word, consuming an object indicated by the root word, becoming what is described by the root word, acting or behaving like what is described by the root word, or commemorating a day as stated in the root word.	rokok 'cigarette'	marokok 'to smoke a cigarette'
Prefixes	paN-	pa-, pang-, pany-, par-, pam-, pan-	Used to form nouns. It conveys the meaning of a person who performs what is described by the root word, a person who has a profession as stated in the root word, a person who frequently or habitually engages in what is mentioned in the root word, a person who possesses the characteristic described by the root word, or a tool used to carry out what is indicated by the root word.	lukis 'to paint'	palukis 'painter'
Prefixes	sa-	none	Used to form adjectives or adverbs. It conveys the meaning of indicating one, expressing entirety or wholeness, or denoting similarity, equivalence, or resemblance.	lowe 'wide'	salowe 'as wide as'
Prefixes	ta-	none	Used to form passive verbs that indicate a person or state. It conveys the meaning of ‘most’ as described by the root word, ‘capable’ or ‘able to do’ what is stated by the root word, ‘accidentally doing’ what is described by the root word, ‘something happening suddenly’ as mentioned in the root word, ‘something that has already happened’ as indicated by the root word, or ‘the subject being in the state’ described by the root word.	pandai 'smart'	tapandai 'smartest'
Suffixes	-ang	-ang, -eng, -ong, -in, -un	Used to form transitive verbs. It conveys the meaning of making something become as described by the root word, placing something in the position stated by the root word, or performing the action mentioned in the root word for someone else.	pendek 'short'	pendekeng 'to make something shorter'
Suffixes	-an	none	Used to form nouns. It conveys the meaning of indicating the result of the action described by the root word, denoting the place or tool for performing what is intended by the root word, or expressing the meaning of each or every as intended by the root word.	tulis 'to write'	tulisan 'writing'
Suffixes	-i	-i, -ki, -pi, -ti	Used to form transitive verbs. It conveys the meaning of indicating that the action described by the root word is done repeatedly, feeling something described by the root word towards someone, giving or adding what is described by the root word to an object, and making something become as described by the root word.	garam 'salt'	garami 'to add salt to something'
Infixes	-am-	-al-	Used to form nouns. It conveys the meaning of an object that possesses the characteristics or qualities described by the root word.	kuniong 'yellow'	kamuniong 'yellow tree'
Infixes	-ar-	none	Used to form nouns. It conveys the meaning of being inflectional or plural.	gigi 'tooth'	garigi 'multiple teeth'
Circumfixes	ka-...-an	none	Used to form nouns or adjectives. It conveys the meaning of a state, condition, or event related to the root word, or denotes 'too' or 'excessively'.	datang 'to arrive'	kadatangan 'arrival'
Circumfixes	paN-...-an	pa-, pang-, pany-, per-, pem-, pen-	Used to form nouns. It conveys the meaning of an object or activity related to the root word or collectiveness.	rantau 'to migrate'	parantauan 'migration area'

=== Reduplication ===
As in other Malayic languages, the Kampar language uses reduplication. Reduplication in the Kampar language carries various meanings, including resemblance or similarity, plurality (many), repetition or frequent occurrence, continuous or ongoing action, completion or past occurrence, reciprocity, superlative intensity, sequential events, and collective grouping. In the Kampar language, reduplication can be divided into three categories: affixed reduplication, full reduplication, and partial reduplication. Affixed reduplication can be further categorized into infix reduplication, simulfix reduplication, prefix reduplication on the first base, prefix reduplication on the second base, suffix reduplication, and circumfix reduplication. Full reduplication is divided into standard full reduplication and sound-alternating full reduplication. Lastly, partial reduplication can be classified into affixed partial reduplication and non-affixed partial reduplication.

Examples of affixed reduplication are shown below:

- tengok 'to see' → tengok-tengoan 'to see one another'
- pajie 'child' → kapajie-pajiean 'childish'
- tampau 'to hit' → tampau-manampau 'to hit something repetitively'
- pendek 'short' → sapendek-pendeke 'as short as possible'

Examples of full reduplication are shown below:

- duduok 'to sit' → duduok-duduok 'to sit around'
- logu 'song' → logu-logu 'songs'
- sayugh 'vegetable' → sayugh-mayugh 'vegetables'
- goghak 'to move' → goghak-gaghik 'movement'

Examples of partial reduplication are shown below:

- laghi 'to run' → belaghi-laghi 'to run around'
- ngunyah 'to chew' → mangunyah-ngunyah 'to chew repetitively'
- padusi 'girl' → padusi-padusi 'girls'
- oti 'bread' → oti-oti 'breads'

=== Nouns ===
There are two types of nouns in the Kampar language: basic nouns and derived nouns. Basic nouns, in terms of form and meaning, are classified into general basic nouns and specific basic nouns. General basic nouns are monomorphemic, consisting of only one morpheme, and semantically denote places, descriptions, time, tools, and methods of performing actions. Meanwhile, specific basic nouns refer to locations, geographical names, idiomatic expressions, personal names, kinship terms, and days of the week. Nouns can be derived through affixation, which is the process of forming nouns by adding specific affixes to root words. The base for noun derivation is not always a root word. The affixes used in noun derivation mainly consist of three prefixes and one suffix: ka-, par-, pang-, and -an. However, since prefixes and suffixes can be combined, there are a total of seven affixation patterns in noun derivation: ka-, par-, pang-, -an, pang-...-an, par-...-an, and ka-...-an.

Examples of basic nouns are shown below:

- matoaghi 'sun'
- ughang 'people'
- kosiok 'sand'
- dobu 'dust'

Examples of derived nouns are shown below:

- kighim 'to send' + -an → kighiman 'something that is sent'
- ka- + pandai 'smart + -an → kapandaian 'intelligence'
- pa- + mudo 'young' → pamudo 'youngster'
- pa- + jonji 'to promise' + -an → pajonjian 'promise/agreement'

=== Verbs ===
Verbs in the Kampar languagegenerally have certain characteristics. Their markers can sometimes be found within the verb itself or determined by other words that appear before it. The markers found within the verb itself are bound morphemes, the types of which can be seen in the verb structure previously outlined. However, it should be clarified that without these markers, it only indicates the possibility that the word is a verb. This is because the same markers can sometimes also function as noun markers, as previously explained. The presence of a verb can sometimes be predicted by looking at specific words that appear before it. The words that precede the verb are auxiliary verbs, such as aspect and modal markers. The aspect markers include words such as ka 'will', sodang 'is (ongoing)', ola 'has (completed)', and baru 'just'. The modal markers include words such as dapek 'can', omuo 'want', bulio 'may', mungkin 'maybe', and barangkali 'perhaps'.

Verbs can be distinguished based on whether they consist of only one or more free morphemes or a combination of free and bound morphemes. Verbs that consist of only one free morpheme include words like tobang 'fly', lolok 'sleep', and makan 'eat'. Verbs consisting of two free morphemes include words like pulang baliok 'go and return', tutun naiok 'go up and down', and jago lolok 'wake up'. Verbs that combine free and bound morphemes appear in highly varied forms. They are usually derived from other word classes, such as nouns, adjectives, numerals, functional words, or even other verbs, through the addition of affixes.

Below are some examples of verbs derived from affixes:

- tingi 'high' + -an → tingian 'to go taller'
- manN- + batu 'stone' → mambatu 'to freeze like a stone'
- pa- + untuok 'for' + -an → pauntuokan 'to be intended for'
- ka- + masuok 'to enter' + -an → kamasuokan 'to be entered by something unexpectedly'

=== Adjectives ===
Adjectives in the Kampar language function as the core of nouns, verbs, and adjectives. Additionally, adjectives also serve as the head of adjectival phrases and frequently function as predicates in sentences. Most adjectives consist of only one morpheme, while others consist of two or more morphemes. Adjectives that consist of a single morpheme are those formed from free morphemes. Examples of this type include adjectives such as tinggi ‘tall’, putio ‘white’, and abak ‘brave’. Adjectives that consist of two or more morphemes contain at least one free morpheme combined with another free morpheme or a bound morpheme. Adjectives that contain two free morphemes include words such as godang ota ‘boaster’, busuok ati ‘jealous’, and mani muluik/‘ 'sweet-mouthed’. These adjectives follow the noun-adjective pattern. In addition to this structure, there are also adjectives with a structure of adjective-adjective, similar to adjectives like kayo andiu ‘rich but foolish’, codiok bughuok ‘clever but ugly’, and itam mani ‘sweet black’ (possibly meaning an appealing dark complexion). Adjectives can also be derived by adding affixes to words from different word classes, as illustrated below:

- ka- + malam 'night' + -an → kamalaman 'too late (night)'
- ka- + candu 'addict' + -an → kacanduan 'addicted'
- ta- + godang 'large' → tagodang 'largest'
- sa- + mura 'cheap' → samura 'as cheap as'

=== Adverbs ===
Morphologically, it is not easy to determine the structure of adverbs. The difficulty lies in the fact that the structure of adjectives in certain cases is identical to the structure of adverbs. The word copek 'quickly' might be categorized as either an adjective or an adverb. In the phrase larino copek-copek 'his running quickly', the word copek-copek, which modifies the noun larino 'running', functions as an adjective. However, in the sentence ino lari copek-copek 'he runs quickly', the same word is no longer considered an adjective because it modifies the verb lari 'run', so it functions as an adverb. The reality shows that it is not easy to determine the structure of adverbs. This affects how challenging it is to determine the marker of adverbial words. What can be reported is that reduplicated morphemes can be proposed as markers of adverbs.

=== Function words ===
The words that fall under the category of function words in the Kampar language include prepositions, coordinators, subordinators, and demonstrative pronouns. Generally, function words consist of free morphemes, and these free morphemes rarely appear together with bound morphemes. Words like di 'at', ka 'to', untuok 'for' are rarely found together with affixes like -an or -kan. Examples of function words in the Kampar language are di 'at', ka 'to', tapi 'but', sobap 'because', and salai 'from'.

== Vocabulary ==
The Kampar language has a rich and distinctive vocabulary, with many words resembling those of standard Minangkabau spoken in neighboring West Sumatra. Over time, it has been influenced by other languages, particularly Indonesian. As the national language, Indonesian has increasingly shaped Kampar, gradually replacing its traditional lexicon. This shift poses a threat to the continued use of traditional Kampar terms, putting them at risk of extinction. Additionally, the influence of regional languages like standard Minangkabau further blurs the distinction between Kampar and Minangkabau vocabulary. The table below provides examples of common Kampar vocabulary used on a daily basis along with their standard Minangkabau, Indonesian, and English equivalents.

=== Numerals ===
Number	Kampar	Minangkabau	Indonesian	English
1	sociek, ciek	ciek, satu, aso	satu	one
2	duo	duo	dua	two
3	tigo	tigo	tiga	three
4	ompek	ampek	empat	four
5	limo	limo	lima	five
6	onam	anam	enam	six
7	tujuoh	tujuah	tujuh	seven
8	lapan	lapan	delapan	eight
9	sambilan	sambilan	sembilan	nine
10	sapuluoh	sapuluah	sepuluh	ten
11	sabole	sabaleh	sebelas	eleven
20	duo puluoh	duo puluah	dua puluh	twenty
50	limo puluoh	limo puluah	lima puluh	fifty
100	saghatuih	saratuih	seratus	one hundred
500	limo ghatuih	limo ratuih	lima ratus	five hundred
1000	saghibu	saribu	seribu	one thousand
5000	limo ghibu	limo ribu	lima ribu	five thousand
100,000	saghatuih ghibu	saratuih ribu	seratus ribu	one hundred thousand
1,000,000	sajuta	sajuta	sejuta, satu juta	one million

=== Directions ===
Kampar	Minangkabau	Indonesian	English
iko, ike, ikie	iko	ini	this
itu, eten, itan, iti	itu	itu	that
siko, komai, komei	siko	sini	here
situ	sinan	situ	there (close)
situ	sinan	sana	there (far)
kek siko, disiko	disiko	disini	over here
kek situ, disitu	disinan	disitu	over there (close)
kek situ, disitu	disinan	disana	over there (far)
ateh	ateh	atas	up
bawah	bawah	bawah	down

=== Personal Pronouns ===
Kampar	Minangkabau	Indonesian	English
ambo, den, deyen, deyan	ambo, awak, aden	aku, saya	I, me
ang, waang, kau, wokau, awak	ang, waang, awak, kau	kamu, engkau	you (informal)
kalian	kalian	kalian	you (prural)
inyo	inyo, wakno, ano	dia	he/she
kami, awak	awak, kami	kami	we (exclusive)
kito, awak	kito	kita	we (inclusive)
mereka	urang-urang, urang tu	mereka	they/them

=== Interrogatives Pronouns ===
Kampar	Minangkabau	Indonesian	English
siapo	sia, siapo	siapa	who
apo	a, apo	apa	what
mangapo, dek apo, karono apo	mangapo, manga, dek a	kenapa, mengapa	why
dimano	dimano, dima	mana, dimana	where
bilo	bilo	kapan	when
condo apo, ba a, bak apo, bagaimano, baapong	bagaimano, ba a	gimana, bagaimana	how
baapo, baghapo	bara	berapa	how much
bilo	bilo, pabilo, kalau	bila, apabila, kalau	if

=== Nouns ===
Kampar	Minangkabau	Indonesian	English
ayiu	aie, aia	air	water
batang/pokok	pohon	pohon	tree
sungai	sungai, sei, batang aia	sungai	river
lauik	lauik	laut	sea
pantai	pantai	pantai	beach
lalaki, kilaki, jantan	lalaki	pria, laki-laki	man
tino, padusi	padusi	wanita, perempuan	woman
tonah	tanah	tanah	land, ground, soil
gunuong	gunuang	gunung	mountain
kosiok, pasiu	pasia	pasir	sand
jalan	jalan	jalan	road
kudo, kuku	kudo	kuda	horse
kondiok	babi	babi	pig
anjiong	anjiang	anjing	dog
sopek	ikan, lauak	ikan	fish
anak, budak, pojie	anak	anak	child, kid
pokan, pasau	pasa	pasar	market
doun	daun	daun	leaf
kulik	kulik	kulit	skin
iku	ikua	ekor	tail
tolingo	talingo	telinga	ear
kopalo	kapalo	kepala	head
lihiu	lihia, lihie	leher	neck
oti	ati	hati	heart
muluik, muncuong	muluik, muncuang	mulut	mouth
iduong	iduang	hidung	nose
obuok, ghombuik	abuak, rambuik	rambut	hair
tingkok	jandela	jendela	window
pintu	pintu	pintu	door
kasu	kasua	kasur	bed

=== Verbs ===
Kampar	Minangkabau	Indonesian	English
makan, sopah	makan, sungkah	makan	eat
minum	minum, minun	minum	drink
laghi	lari	lari	run
cughito, cokap	kecek	bicara	to talk
masak	masak	masak	to cook
masuok	masuak	masuk	to enter
kolu	kalua	keluar	to exit
togak	tagak, badiri	berdiri	to stand
duduok	duduak	duduk	to sit
tobang	tabang	terbang	to fly
tengok	liek,caliak	lihat, tengok	see
bayu, bayi	baia	bayar	pay
bamain	bamain	bermain	to play
ambiok	ambiak	ambil	take
boli	bali	beli	buy
jue	jua	jual	sell
baliok	baliak	balik	to go back
lolok/tidu	lalok, tidua	tidur	to sleep
jago	jago	bangun	to wake up
poi/pei	pai	pergi	to go
bai/bei	bari	beri, kasih	to give
baghajau, balajar	baraja	belajar	to study
omuo	amuah	mau	to want

=== Adjectives ===
Kampar	Minangkabau	Indonesian	English
bansek	bansaik	miskin	poor
kayo	kayo	kaya	rich
ancak	rancak	bagus, baik	good
bughuok	buruak	buruk	bad
pandai	pandai	pandai	smart
ongok, binguong, andiu	ongok, pakak, tea	bodoh	stupid
sonang	sanang	senang	happy
usuoh	rusuah, sadiah	sedih	sad
bosau, godang	gadang	besar, gede	big, large
kociok, ketek	ketek, kaciak	kecil	small
panjang	panjang	panjang	long
pendek	pendek	pendek	short
tinggi	tinggi	tinggi	tall
angek	paneh, angek	panas	hot
lombok	lambok	lembab	humid
paik	kalek, paik	pahit	bitter
mani	manih, kamek	manis	sweet
toghang	tarang	terang	bright
kolam	kalam	gelap	dark
boghek	barek	berat	heavy
koyiong	kariang	kering	dry
baghu	baru	baru	new
lamo	lamo	lama	long (time), old
copek	capek	cepat	quick
cegak	sihaik	sehat	healthy
sakik	sakik	sakit	sick
borosio	barasia	bersih	clean
banyak	banyak, rami	banyak	many
saketek	saketek	sedikit	little

== Writing system ==
The Kampar language was historically written in the Jawi script, also known as Arab-Melayu 'Arab-Malay', a modified form of the Arabic script. In the past, Jawi was widely used in Kampar, especially for Islamic purposes, including manuscripts, inscriptions, and other forms of traditional literature. The Jawi script was widely used to record traditional Kampar literature, such as nazam, a literary form passed down through generations. Typically written and recited in a rhythmic manner, nazam is often rich in spiritual values, particularly Islamic teachings. Nearly all nazam convey religious advice, laws, history, morality, and ethnic customs, all of which are deeply rooted in Islamic principles. However, very few Kampar people can read the Jawi script, as literacy rates remain low, and traditional Kampar literature is primarily passed down through oral tradition. The use of the Jawi script declined significantly with the onset of European colonization in the region, who introduced the Latin script. After Indonesia's independence, Indonesian, written in the Latin script, became the national language and the primary medium of instruction in schools, further accelerating the decline of the Jawi script. Today, the use of the Jawi script in Kampar is limited, though it is still taught as part of the regional language curriculum in local schools.

== See also ==
- Kampar Regency
- Minangkabau language
- Kuantan language
- Mukomuko language
- Pesisir language
- Jamee language

== Bibliography ==
- Andriana, Mella; Auzar; Charlina (2020-06-18). "Reduplikasi Bahasa Melayu Riau Dialek Kampar Kiri". GERAM. 8 (1): 27–36. doi:10.25299/geram.2020.vol8(1).4848. ISSN 2580-376X.
- Martius (2016-08-04). "Afiks Bahasa Melayu Riau Dialek Kampar (Kajian Fungsi dan Makna)". Sosial Budaya. 12 (2): 203–214. doi:10.24014/sb.v12i2.1940 (inactive 1 July 2025). ISSN 2407-1684.
- Sulaiman, Ermawati; Hermaliza, Hermaliza (2019-12-08). "Nomina Bahasa Melayu Riau Dialek Kampar: Tinjauan Bentuk Morfologis". GERAM. 7 (2): 1–16. doi:10.25299/geram.2019.vol7(2).3768 (inactive 1 July 2025). ISSN 2580-376X.
- Said, Chatlinas; Gandor, Yusuf; HRL, Zainuddin; Yusuf, H. Yusna; Noor, Rumia Bahri; Zulnasri (1986). Struktur Bahasa Minangkabau Di Kabupaten Kampar [Structure of the Minangkabau language spoken in Kampar Regency] (PDF) (in Indonesian). Jakarta: Agency for Language Development and Cultivation.
- Sardila, Vera; Nurani, Nuraini; Faiza, Nurul; Silvia, Nur; Ainiyah, Nazhratun (2024-07-27). "Analisis Perbedaan Bahasa Melayu Riau Klasik dan Bahasa Melayu Riau Modern di Kampar". Gurindam: Jurnal Bahasa dan Sastra (in Indonesian). 4 (1): 18–26. doi:10.24014/gjbs.v4i1.28630 (inactive 1 July 2025). ISSN 2798-6675.
