= Riau Malays =

Ethnic group of Indonesia

Orang Melayu Riau ملايو رياو
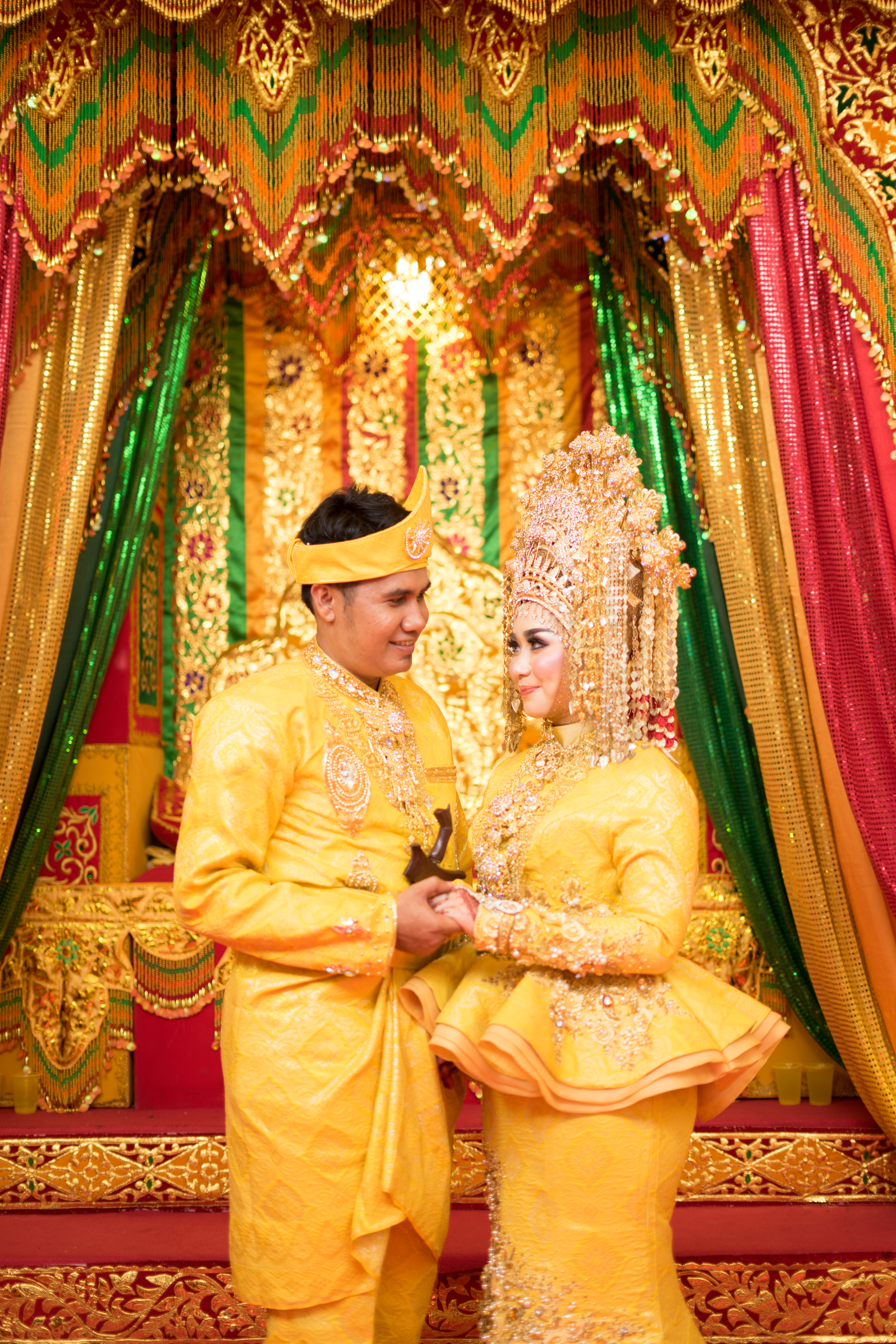
- Traditional Riau Malays wedding dress.

Regions with significant populations
- Indonesia (Riau • Riau Islands • North Sumatra • Jambi • Bengkulu); Malaysia (Johor • Malacca • Selangor • Negeri Sembilan • Pahang)
- Indonesia: 2,610,890
- Malaysia: 168,000

Languages
- Riau Malay; Indonesian

Religion
- Sunni Islam

Related ethnic groups
- Malays

Riau Malays (Malay: Orang Melayu Riau, Jawi: ملايو رياو) are a sub-group of Malays native to the provinces of Riau and the Riau Islands of eastern Sumatra, Indonesia. They only make up 29% of the population of the Riau Islands, and around 45% of the population of Riau. Riau Malays, especially in the coastal areas of Riau and the Riau Islands, share the same cultural, historical and linguistic backgrounds with Johorean and Singaporean Malays due to their common Malaccan origin in the 15th century.

== Etymology ==
Malay (Chinese: 末羅瑜國; pinyin: Mòluóyú Guó), derived from the word Malaya dvipa from the Hindu scripture Purana which means land surrounded by water which refers to an Old Malay Kingdom in Jambi in the 7th century.

The name riau itself has three opinions. First, from Portuguese word, rio means river. In 1514, there was a Portuguese military expedition exploring the Siak River, with the aim of finding the location of a kingdom that they believe exists in the area, at the same time pursuing the followers of Sultan Mahmud Shah who withdrew to Kampar after the fall of the Malacca Sultanate. The second opinion "riau" comes from the word "riahi" which means sea water, which is thought to have come from the book One Thousand and One Nights.

The third opinion is taken from the word rioh or noisy which comes from the naming of the local people which means crowded, the hustle and bustle of working peoples, which became known since Raja Kecik moved the center of the Malay kingdom from Johor to Riau ulu in 1719. This name was used as one of the four main countries that formed the kingdoms of Riau, Lingga, Johor, and Pahang. However, the result of the Anglo-Dutch Treaty of 1824 between Netherlands and United Kingdom resulted in the splitting of this kingdom into two. The Johor-Pahang hemisphere is under British influence, Meanwhile, the Riau-Lingga hemisphere was under the influence of the Dutch.

== Origin ==
Riau is thought to have been inhabited since 10,000–14,000 BCE. This conclusion was drawn after the discovery of tools from the Pleistocene era in the Singingi River watershed in Kuantan Singingi Regency in August 2009. The stone tools found included a penetak ax, perimbas, shaver, flakes, and core stones which are the basic ingredients for making shaver, and flakes. The research team also found some wood fossils that are thought to be older than the stone tools. It is suspected that the human user of the tools found in Riau is Pithecanthropus erectus, as has been found in Central Java.

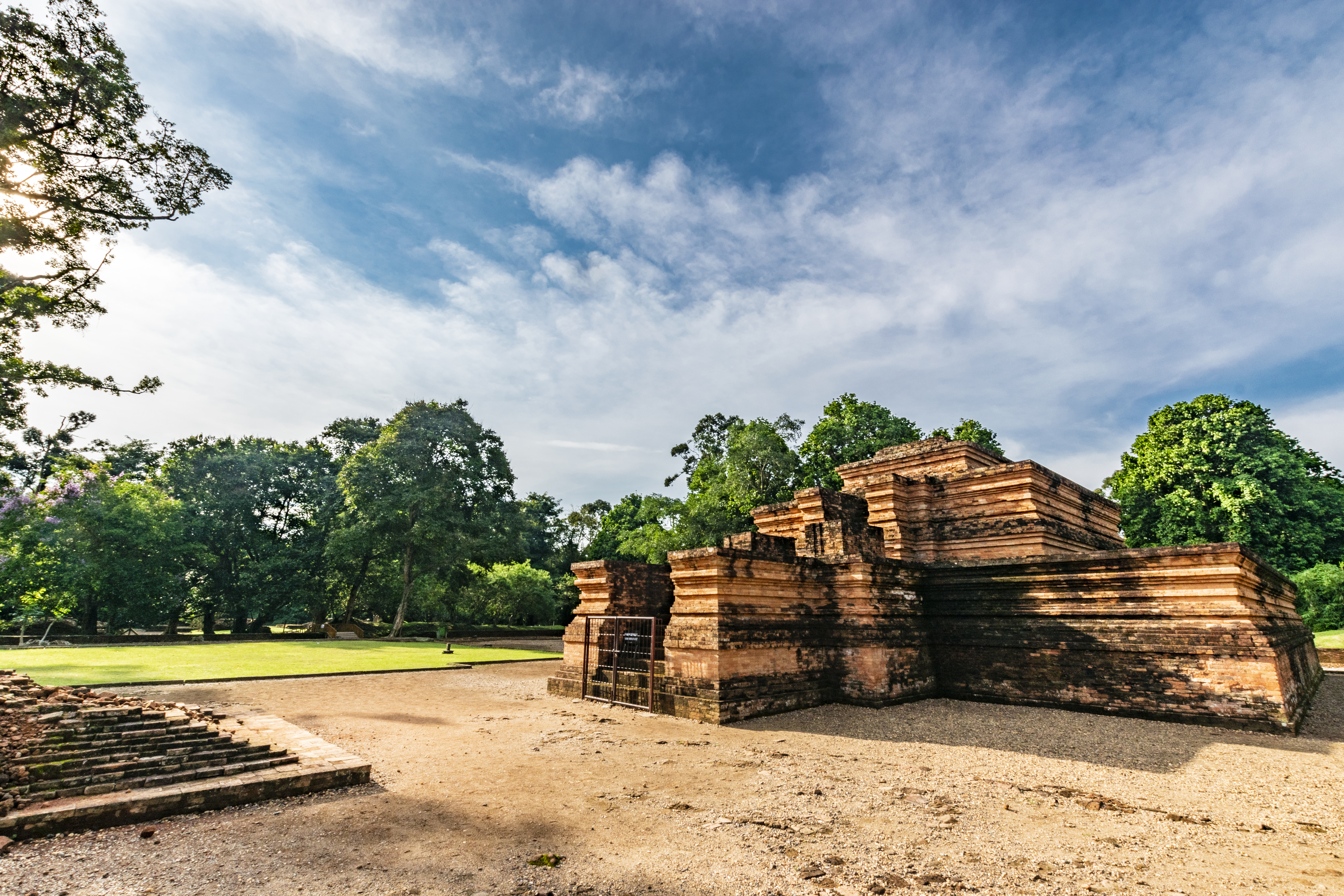
Muara Takus Temple located in Kampar Regency are one of the evidences of the existence of ancient Melayu Kingdom (a kingdom centered in eastern Sumatra)

.

The Riau Malay kingdom was also a continuation of the Sriwijaya Empire heritage based on religion Buddhist. This is evidence of the discovery of Muara Takus Temple which is thought to be the center of the Srivijaya government, which has an architecture resembling the temples in India. Besides that, George Cœdès also found similarities in the structure of the Srivijaya government with the Malay sultanates of the 15th century. The Malay kingdom started from the 12th century Bintan-Tumasik Kingdom, followed by a period of Islamic Malay Sultanates.

The earliest text that discusses the Malay world is Sulalatus Salatin or what is known as Sejarah Melayu by Tun Sri Lanang, in 1612. According to the book, Seguntang Hill is the place where The Sapurba came, whose descendants were scattered throughout the Malay World. Sang Mutiara became king in Tanjungpura and Sang Nila Utama became king of Bintan before finally moving to Singapore.

== Religion ==
"So all the Malay customs are also valid according to Syarak and Syariah. It is these customs that have been passed down from generation to generation to the land of Johor, the land of Riau, the land of Indragiri, the land of Siak, the land of Pelalawan, and all the lands of the Malays. All customs that are not based on Islamic law are wrong and cannot be used anymore. Since then, Malay customs have been called syarak-based customs which adhere to the book of Allah and the sunnah of the Prophet".

— Tonel, 1920.

Malay society and culture are based heavily on Islam which is the foundation of their customs and tradition. The Malays adhere to the philosophy of bersendikan syarak and syarak bersendikan Kitabullah (Customs based on Sharia and Sharia is based on the Quran).

Prior to the arrival of Islam to the archipelago, many parts of the region were under the Srivijaya Kingdom between the 7th and 14th centuries which were heavily influenced by Hindu-Buddhist traditions. At that time Islam had been introduced when the Maharaja of Srivijaya sent a letter to the Caliph Umar bin Abdul Aziz, containing a request to send a messenger to explain Islamic law to him.

In the 12th century, the entry of Islam into the archipelago was brought through the Samudera Pasai which had been recognized as the pioneer of the Islamic empire in the archipelago in its time.

The process of Islamic expansion occurred through trade, marriage and missionary activities of Muslim scholars. These factors led to the peaceful spread and growing influence of Islam throughout the Malay World. A strong factor in the acceptance of Islam by the Malay community is the aspect of human equality, which according to the ideology of the people at that time adhered to the caste system in Hinduism, where the lower caste society is lower than the higher caste members.

During the Golden era of the Malaccan Sultanate, many elements of Islamic law, including political science and administration, are incorporated to form the basis of Qanun Law of Malacca. The ruler of Melaka was given the title 'Sultan' and was not only acted as a Head of State but also the Head of the religion of Islam. By the 15th century, Islam gradually spread throughout Melaka including the entire Malay Peninsula, Riau Islands, Bintan, Lingga, and several areas on the east coast of Sumatra, namely Jambi, Bengkalis, Siak, Rokan, Indragiri, Kampar, and Kuantan. Malacca is considered a catalyst in the expansion of Islam to other areas such as Palembang, Sumatra, Patani, North Borneo, Brunei, Sulu Islands, and Mindanao.

While the Malays became Islamized, the Sakai and Talang Mamak people who are closely related to Malays still adhere to ancient traditions or Animism. However some have also embraced Islam but retains their own unique identity and culture from the Malays.

== Language ==
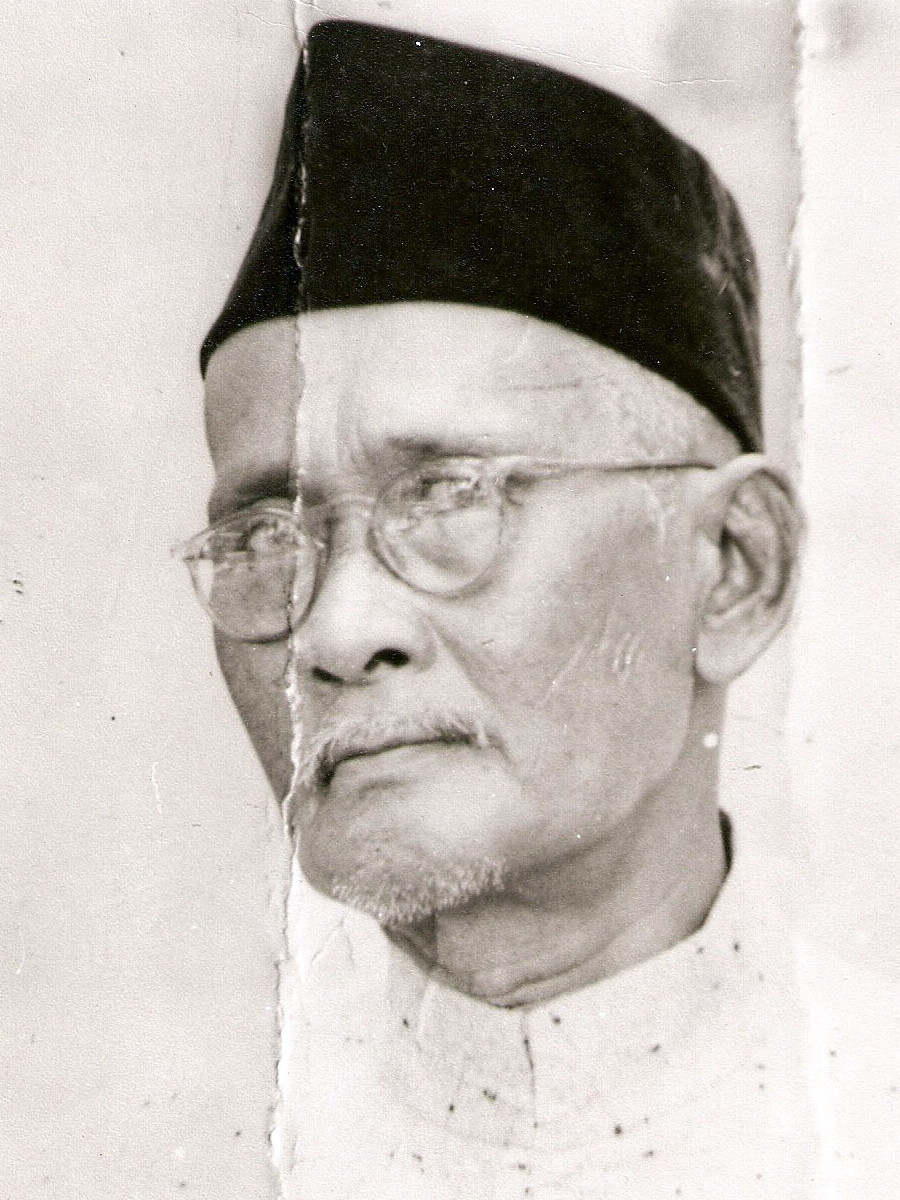
Raja Ali Haji, an poet, he played a vital role in modernizing the Malay language, one of his books that is Pedoman Bahasa was the first dictionary of its kind in the Dutch East Indies (now Indonesia)

Riau Malay language has a fairly long history, because the history began in the Sriwijaya Empire, At that time Malay had become the language of trade in the Archipelago. Initially the center of the kingdom was in Malacca then moved to Johor, and finally moved to Riau. Therefore, the Malay language of the Malacca era was known as Malacca Malay, Johor era is known as Johor Malay and Riau era is known as Riau Malay.

Riau Malay language has been nurtured in such a way by Raja Ali Haji, so that this language already has standards in its day and has also been widely published, in the form of literary books, history, and religion books in the era of classical Malay literature in the 19th century.

=== Dialects ===
The Malay dialects in Riau and Riau Islands exhibits a high number of dialectal variations due to historical migrations, border changes, geographic isolation and influences from other languages and countries. In a mainland Riau, there are two distinct varieties of Malay or Malayic languages namely Inland Riau and Coastal Riau. Varieties of Inland Riau Malay are spoken in Kampar (Ocu), Kuantan Singingi and Rokan. Meanwhile, varieties of Coastal Riau are dominant in Meranti Islands, Pelalawan, Siak-Pekanbaru and Tembilahan. Some linguists classified Inland Riau Malay as varieties of Minangkabau due to its shared phonology and vocabulary. Those spoken in the coastal parts of Riau and Riau Islands are part of a wider Johor-Riau dialect continuum. However, not all variants of Malay in Riau belong to those two traditional groups, there are also a number of distinct Malayic varieties such as languages spoken by the Orang Lauts, Duano', Talang Mamak, Akit, Anambas Malay and Natuna Malay which are closely related but are not traditionally counted as part of Riau Malay.

The differences between the Inland and Coastal Riau dialects are characterized by words which in Indonesian are words that end in vowels /a/; which in Inland Riau dialects it is generally pronounced with a vowel /o/, while in Coastal Riau and Riau Islands it is usually pronounced with a schwa or /ə/. Some examples include: The mention of the word /bila/ (when), /tiga/ (three), /kata/ (word) will be so in the Riau Mainland dialect: /bilo/, /tigo/, /kato/. While in the Riau Islands dialect it becomes: /bilə/, /tigə/, /katə/.

=== Writing ===
Jawi alphabet (جاوي), also known as the Arabic-Malay alphabet, is a variant of the Arabic alphabet which was used to write the Malay language and neighbouring Sumatran languages such as Acehnese and Minangkabau. This alphabet is the co-official script of Brunei, and also gained regional status in Malaysia, Indonesia, Patani, and Singapore for religious and educational purposes.

== Culture ==
=== Kinship system ===
Each nuclear family lives in their own house, except for new couples who usually prefer to stay at the wife's house until they have their first child. Therefore, their pattern of settling can be said to be neolocal. The nuclear family they call sex generally build a house in the neighborhood where the wife lives. The principle of lineage or kinship is more likely to be parental or bilateral.

Kinship relations are carried out with special greeting words. The first child is called long or eldest, second child ngah/ongah, below is called cik, the youngest is called cu/ucu. Usually the call is added by mentioning the physical characteristics of the person concerned, for example cik itam if cik that black skinned, ngah utih if ngah it's white, cu andak if ucu that's a short person, cik unggal if buyung it's an only child and so on. But sometimes when greeting people they don't know or they just know, they simply call with the greeting abang, akak, dek, or nak.

In the past, the Malays also lived in groups according to their origins, which they called tribes. This lineage of descent uses a patrilineal kinship line. However, the Riau Malays who live on the mainland of Sumatra partially adhere to a matrilineal ethnic understanding. There are also call the people hinduk or the forerunner. Each people is led by a penghulu. If the tribe lives in a village, then the penghulu immediately becomes Datuk Penghulu Kampung or Village Head. Each penghulu is also assisted by several figures such as batin, jenang, tua-tua, and monti. In the field of religion known leaders such as imam and khatib.

=== Traditional house ===
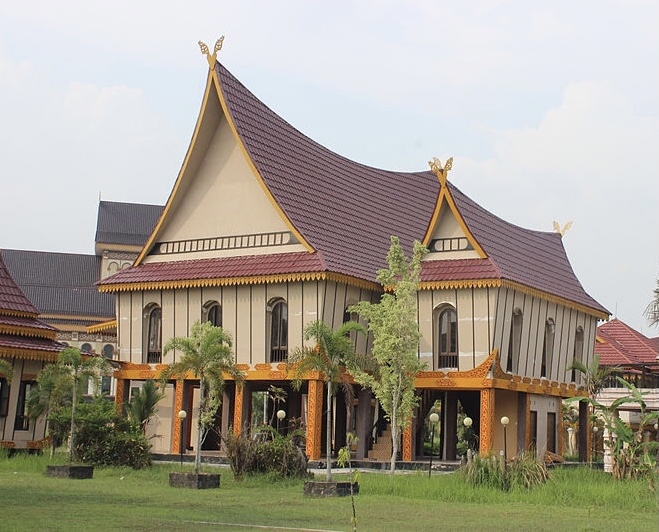
Riau Malay House, Roof Lontiok/Lentik.

In traditional Malay society, the house is a complete building that can be used as a family residence, a place for deliberation, a place of descent, a place of refuge for anyone in need. Therefore, traditional Malay houses are generally large. In addition to being large, Malay houses are also always in the form of a stage or a house with a pit, facing the rising sun.

Types of Malay houses include residential houses, hall houses, houses of worship and storage houses. The naming is adjusted to the function of each building. In general, there are five types of Riau Malay traditional houses, namely:

- Malay House Roof Lontik.
- Malay House Roof Lipat Kajang.
- Malay House Roof Lipat Pandan.

=== Traditional clothing ===
Baju Melayu are common clothes for men that are used in general by Malays across Maritime Southeast Asia. There are two types of Baju Melayu namely Cekak Musang and Teluk Belanga which differs in the length of its sleeves, collar, number of pockets and buttons. A pair of shirts and pants are usually made of the same type of fabric, namely silk, cotton, or a mixture of polyester and cotton. Baju Melayu is usually accompanied by sarong or Kain Pelikat which is a complementary cloth that is often used to mix and match with Malay clothes, either made of songket cloth or sarong. A black headgear commonly known as songkok or peci is worn to complete the outfit.

As for women, the traditional dress is called Baju kurung which is a form of a long loose dress, consisting of a skirt and blouse. Usually the skirt is made of a long cloth made of songket, sarong or batik with pleats on one side.

=== Traditional cuisine ===
Riau Malay traditional cuisine has many similarities with other Rumpun Malay and Sumatran cuisine in general which uses a lot of spices and coconut milk to produce goulash food which is seasoned, savory, fatty, and thick to reddish and dark yellow in color. Most of the menu uses fish as basic ingredients, from patin, lomek, baung, anchovy, tenggiri, pari, and crustaceans, and often use buffalo or beef meat. Additional seasoning commonly used is belacan. Almost every Malay dish is served with white rice or with nasi lemak and usually eaten by hand.
