= Minangkabau language =

Austronesian language, spoken by the Minangkabau of West Sumatra

Minangkabau
- Minang
- Bahaso Minangkabau بهاس منڠكربو
- Pronunciation: [ˈbaso mi.naŋˈka.bau]
- Native to: Indonesia; West Sumatra
- Region: West Sumatra, Riau, Jambi, Bengkulu, North Sumatra, Aceh (Indonesia); Negeri Sembilan, Selangor (Malaysia)
- Ethnicity: Minangkabau; Aneuk Jamèë; Mukomuko; Kampar; Kuantan; Pesisir
- Native speakers: 5.5 million (2007)
- Language family: Austronesian: Malayo-Polynesian; disputed: Malayo-Sumbawan or Greater North Borneo; Malayo-Chamic-BSS; Malayic; Minangkabau
- Dialects: West Sumatran Minangkabau; Jamee; Kampar; Kuantan; Pesisir; Mukomuko Agam-Tanah Datar Lima Puluh Kota Pancung Soal Rokan Rantau varieties (in Jambi and North Sumatra)
- Writing system: Latin (Minangkabau Latin alphabet); Minangkabau script

Official status
- Regulated by: Badan Pengembangan dan Pembinaan Bahasa (in Indonesia)

Language codes
- ISO 639-2: min
- ISO 639-3: min
- Glottolog: mina1268
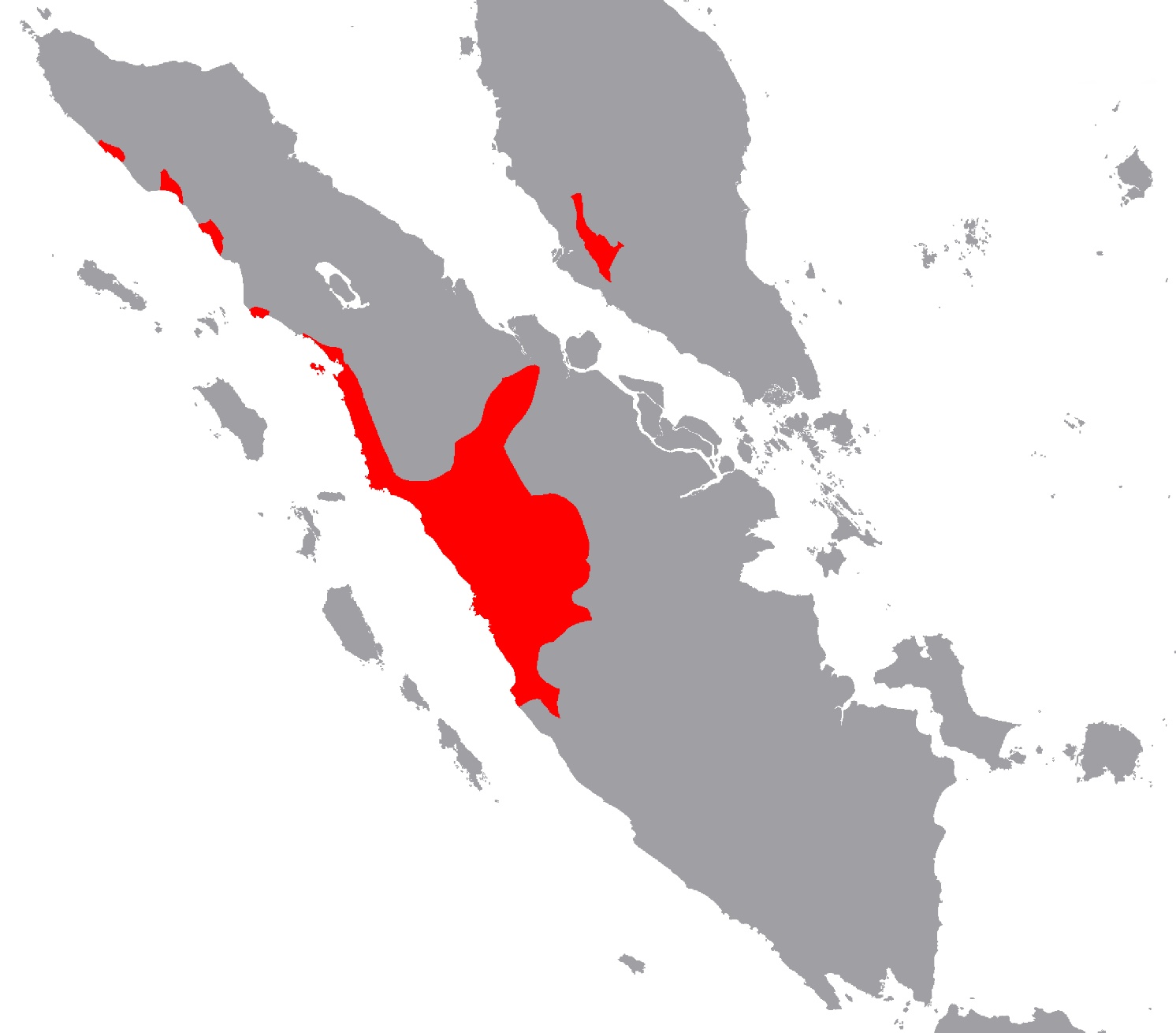
- Areas where Minangkabau is significantly spoken

A man speaking Minangkabau.

Minangkabau (ˌminɑːŋkəˈbau MEE-nahng-kah-bow; Bahaso Minangkabau, Jawi: بهاس منڠكربو, IPA: [ˈbaso mi.naŋˈka.bau]), simply known as Minang, is an Austronesian language spoken by the Minangkabau of West Sumatra, the western part of Riau, the southern and western coast of Aceh, the northern part of Bengkulu and Jambi, and also in several cities throughout Indonesia by migrated Minangkabau. The language is also a lingua franca along the western coastal region of the province of North Sumatra, and is even used in parts of Aceh, where it is known as the Aneuk Jamee dialect.

Minangkabau is similar to Malay. The relationship between the languages is characterized in different ways. Some see Minangkabau as an early variety of Malay, while others think of Minangkabau as a distinct (Malayic) language.

Minangkabau is one of a few languages that generally lacks verb forms and grammatical subject-object distinctions.

The Minangkabau language is still commonly spoken amongst the Minangkabau people, and it is used amongst the widespread Minangkabau diaspora. The Minangkabau language is deemed as "informal" in the urban regions of Padang, with the Indonesian language being preferred instead in formal institutions. Youth in the city frequently uses a mixture of conversational Minang and Indonesian slang.

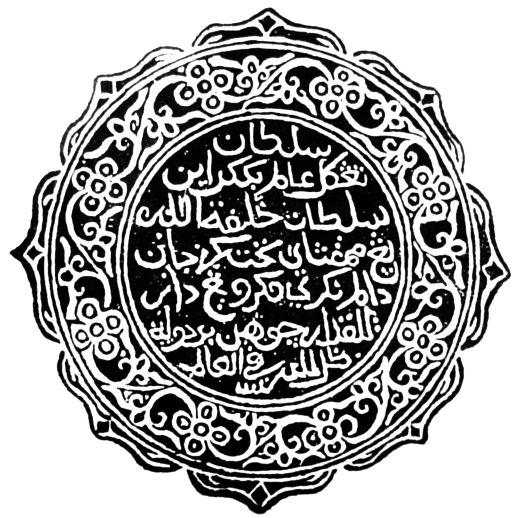
Minangkabau language in Arabic script on Minangkabau royal seal from the 19th century

== Geographic distribution ==
Minangkabau is the native language of the Minangkabau people of West Sumatra. There are approximately 5.5 million speakers of the language. It is also spoken in the western part of Riau, the southern and western coast of Aceh, the northern part of Bengkulu and Jambi. Along the western coastal region of North Sumatra, the language is also a lingua franca. The language is used and called Aneuk Jamee in parts of Aceh.

Besides Indonesia, Minangkabau is also spoken in Malaysia, by some descendants of migrants from the Minang-speaking region in Sumatra (Ranah Minang, Tanah Minang, or Land of the Minang). Significant numbers of the early migrants settled in what is now the Malaysian state of Negeri Sembilan; this Negeri Sembilan Malay, known as Bahaso Nogori / Baso Nogoghi, is now a distinct language, more closely related to Malay than to Minangkabau. More recent immigrants are known as Minang.

== Dialects ==
The Minangkabau language has several dialects, sometimes differing between nearby villages (e.g. separated by a river). The dialects are Rao Mapat Tunggul, Muaro Sungai Lolo, Payakumbuh, Pangkalan-Lubuk Alai, Agam-Tanah Datar, Pancungsoal, Kotobaru, Sungai Bendung Air, and Karanganyar. In everyday communication between Minangkabau people of different regions, the Agam-Tanah Datar dialect (Baso Padang or Baso Urang Awak 'our [people's] language') is often used and has become a kind of standard.

The Tapan language, spoken in the town of Tapan in southern West Sumatra province, is a recently discovered Malayan language which has been proposed as related to but not part of Minangkabau. Together, Tapan and Minangkabau would form a Greater Minangkabau subgroup. The two languages Tapan and Muko-Muko form a Lunangic subgroup within the Minangic (Greater Minangkabau) language group.

The Minangic subgroup is characterized by the following word-final sound changes.

- *V[hi]ŋ > V[hi]ăŋ
- *us > uĭh
- *at > eʔ
- *as > eh
- *is > ih

== Phonology ==
The sound inventory of Minangkabau is listed below:

=== Consonants ===
		Labial	Alveolar	Palatal	Velar	Glottal
Nasal		m ⟨m⟩	n ⟨n⟩	ɲ ⟨ny⟩	ŋ ⟨ng⟩	
Plosive/ Affricate	voiceless	p ⟨p⟩	t ⟨t⟩	tʃ ⟨c⟩	k ⟨k⟩	ʔ ⟨k⟩, ⟨ʼ⟩
Plosive/ Affricate	voiced	b ⟨b⟩	d ⟨d⟩	dʒ ⟨j⟩	ɡ ⟨g⟩	
Fricative			s ⟨s⟩			h ⟨h⟩
Lateral			l ⟨l⟩			
Rhotic			r ⟨r⟩			
Semivowel		w ⟨w⟩		j ⟨y⟩		

=== Vowels ===
Monophthongs
	Front	Central	Back
Close	i ⟨i⟩		u ⟨u⟩
Mid	e ⟨e⟩		o ⟨o⟩
Open		a ⟨a⟩	

Diphthongs
	Front	Back
Close	iə̯⁓ie̯ ⟨ia⟩	uə̯⁓uo̯ ⟨ua⟩, ui̯ ⟨ui⟩
Mid	eə̯ ⟨ea⟩	oə̯ ⟨oa⟩
Open	ai̯ ⟨ai⟩, au̯ ⟨au⟩	

== Example ==
Article 1 of the Universal Declaration of Human Rights in Minangkabau:

Sadonyo urang lahia mardeka jo punyo martabaik jo hak-hak nan samo. Nyo diagiah aka jo hati nurani sarato handaknyo babaua samo nan lainnyo dalam samangaik badunsanak.

Article 1 of the Universal Declaration of Human Rights in English:

All human beings are born free and equal in dignity and rights. They are endowed with reason and conscience and should act towards one another in a spirit of brotherhood.

=== Sentences ===
English	Minangkabau	Indonesian
How are you now?	Baʼa kaba sanak kini?	Bagaimana kabar anda sekarang?
I'm well. How about you?	Lai elok-elok se nyo. Sanak baʼa?	Saya baik-baik saja. Anda bagaimana?
What is your name?	Sia namo sanak?	Siapa nama kamu?
My name is ...	Namo ambo ...	Nama saya ...
Thank you.	Tarimo kasih.	Terima kasih.
The trees in the jungle don't have the same height, moreover the people. (Proverb)	Sadang kayu di rimbo 'ndak samo tinggi, apo lai manusia. (Pribaso)	Sedangkan pohon di hutan tidak sama tinggi, apalagi manusia. (Peribahasa)
"As the frog swims, so he/she swims too." (He/she is doing something without having a goal.)	"Co a koncek baranang co itu inyo" baʼarti mangarajokan suatu tapi indak punyo tujuan.	"Bagaimana katak berenang seperti itulah dia" berarti mengerjakan sesuatu tanpa punya tujuan.
Don't throw the rubbish here! (Command)	Indak buliah mambuang sarok di siko! (Parintah)	Dilarang membuang sampah di sini! (Perintah)
Do not touch! You will burn your hand.	Ijan dipacik! Beko tangan angku tabaka.	Jangan disentuh! Nanti tanganmu terbakar.

=== Numerals ===
Number	Minangkabau	Indonesian	English
1	cieʼ	satu	one
2	duo	dua	two
3	tigo	tiga	three
4	ampeʼ	empat	four
5	limo	lima	five
6	anam	enam	six
7	tujuah	tujuh	seven
8	lapan	(de)lapan	eight
9	sambilan	sembilan	nine
10	sapuluah	sepuluh	ten
11	sabaleh	sebelas	eleven
15	limo baleh	lima belas	fifteen
50	limo puluah	lima puluh	fifty
100	saratuih	seratus	one hundred/a hundred
150	saratuih limo puluah	seratus lima puluh	one hundred and fifty
500	limo ratuih	lima ratus	five hundred
#,000	ribu	ribu	thousand
#,000,000	juta	juta	million
#,000,000,000	milliar	milliar	billion

== See also ==
- Minangkabau people
- Overseas Minangkabau
