= Teluk Kuantan =

- Location in Riau and Indonesia Teluk Kuantan (Indonesia)
- Coordinates: 0°31′47.13″S 101°34′19.42″E
- Country: Indonesia
- Province: Riau
- Regency: Kuantan Singingi Regency
- District: Kuantan Tengah District
- Elevation: 171 ft (52 m)

Population (mid 2023 estimate)
  - Total: 54,381
- Time zone: UTC+7 (Indonesia Western Standard Time)

Teluk Kuantan (also known as Koto Taluk) is a town and the seat of Kuantan Singingi Regency, Riau province, Indonesia.

== Climate ==
Teluk Kuantan has a tropical rainforest climate (Af) with heavy rainfall year-round.

Climate data for Teluk Kuantan
Month	Jan	Feb	Mar	Apr	May	Jun	Jul	Aug	Sep	Oct	Nov	Dec	Year
Mean daily maximum °C (°F)	30.4 (86.7)	31.0 (87.8)	31.4 (88.5)	31.7 (89.1)	32.0 (89.6)	31.7 (89.1)	31.4 (88.5)	31.4 (88.5)	31.3 (88.3)	31.2 (88.2)	31.1 (88.0)	30.6 (87.1)	31.3 (88.3)
Daily mean °C (°F)	26.3 (79.3)	26.6 (79.9)	26.9 (80.4)	27.2 (81.0)	27.4 (81.3)	27.0 (80.6)	26.6 (79.9)	26.7 (80.1)	26.8 (80.2)	26.7 (80.1)	26.7 (80.1)	26.4 (79.5)	26.8 (80.2)
Mean daily minimum °C (°F)	22.2 (72.0)	22.2 (72.0)	22.5 (72.5)	22.8 (73.0)	22.8 (73.0)	22.3 (72.1)	21.9 (71.4)	22.0 (71.6)	22.3 (72.1)	22.3 (72.1)	22.4 (72.3)	22.3 (72.1)	22.3 (72.2)
Average precipitation mm (inches)	217 (8.5)	216 (8.5)	246 (9.7)	287 (11.3)	224 (8.8)	138 (5.4)	135 (5.3)	154 (6.1)	218 (8.6)	250 (9.8)	298 (11.7)	267 (10.5)	2,650 (104.2)
Source: Climate-Data.org
