= Agency for Language Development and Cultivation =

Government agency regulating Indonesian language

- Badan Pengembangan dan Pembinaan Bahasa
- Seal of Educational Ministries

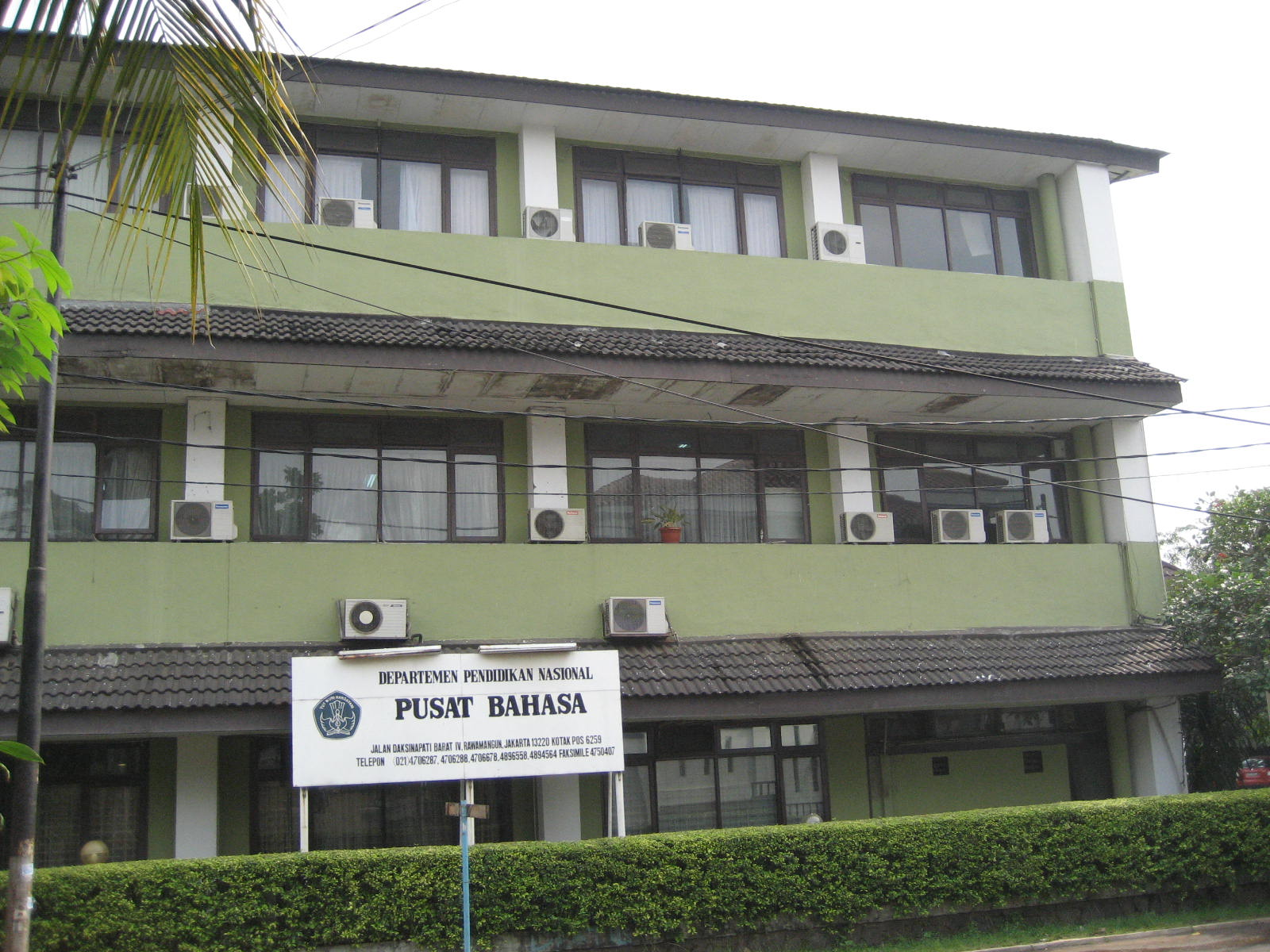

Agency overview
- Preceding agency: Language and Book Development Agency Badan Pengembangan Bahasa dan Perbukuan
- Jurisdiction: Indonesia
- Headquarters: Jalan Daksinapati Barat IV, Rawamangun, East Jakarta
- Minister responsible: Abdul Mu'ti, Ministry of Primary and Secondary Education
- Website: badanbahasa.kemendikdasmen.go.id

The Agency for Language Development and Cultivation (Indonesian: Badan Pengembangan dan Pembinaan Bahasa), formerly the Language and Book Development Agency (Badan Pengembangan Bahasa dan Perbukuan) and the Language Centre (Pusat Bahasa), is the institution responsible for standardising and regulating the Indonesian language as well as maintaining the indigenous languages of Indonesia. It is an agency under the Ministry of Primary and Secondary Education of Indonesia.

To support the implementation of its duties, this agency has 30 Language Center/Office units spread throughout Indonesia.

== History ==
The agency was founded in 1947 as the Language and Culture Research Institute (Instituut voor Taal en Cultuur Onderzoek, ITCO), part of the University of Indonesia. It was headed by Gerrit Jan Held. Parallel to this, the newly formed Indonesian government, having just declared independence in 1945, created the Balai Bahasa ("Language Bureau") in March 1948. At that time, this organisation was under the Culture Division of the Ministry of Education, Teaching and Culture.

In 1952, both organisations were integrated into the Faculty of Literature at the University of Indonesia. The combined organisation was named the Division of Language and Culture (Lembaga Bahasa dan Budaya). Seven years later, on 1 June 1959, the division was renamed the Division of Language and Literature (Lembaga Bahasa dan Kesusastraan), and was integrated into the Department of Education, Teaching and Culture.

On 3 November 1966, the division was again renamed to Directorate of Language and Literature (Direktorat Bahasa dan Kesusasteraan) under the Directorate General of Culture, which was itself under the Department of Education and Culture. On 27 May 1969, the directorate was renamed to Division of National Language (Lembaga Bahasa Nasional, LBN) under the same Directorate General.

On 1 April 1975, the LBN was once again renamed to The Centre of Language Learning and Research (Pusat Pembinaan dan Pengembangan Bahasa, PPPB). Unofficially, the term Pusat Bahasa was used to refer to the PPPB due to its lengthy name.

Due to a presidential order in 2000, the PPPB was officially renamed as the "Language Center", and placed under the Secretariat General of the Department of National Education.

In 2009, the Indonesian government and People's Representative Council passed Law 24/2009 on the Flag, Language, State Symbol and National Anthem. Because of that act and a presidential order, the Language Center was renamed as Language Development and Fostering Agency (Badan Pengembangan dan Pembinaan Bahasa), and placed under the Ministry of Education and Culture.

As of 30 October 2018 and refer to Presidential Decree No 101/2018, the agency has been renamed as Language and Book Development Agency (Badan Pengembangan Bahasa dan Perbukuan).

On 2 January 2020, based on Presidential Decree No 82/2019 the agency name reverted back to Badan Pengembangan dan Pembinaan Bahasa and book-related affairs was placed under Badan Penelitian dan Pengembangan dan Perbukuan (Research and Development Agency within Ministry of Education and Culture).

On 15 July 2021, the Ministry of Education and Culture and the Ministry of Research and Technology were merged into the Ministry of Education, Culture, Research and Technology. The agency was then placed under the new ministry.

On 8 November 2024, the Ministry of Education, Culture, Research and Technology was split into three ministries, one of them is Ministry of Primary and Secondary Education. The agency was then placed under the new ministry.

== Functions ==
The Language Development and Fostering Agency carries out the following functions:

1. Formulating technical policies in the field of language and literature development, fostering, and protection;
2. Implementing language and literature development, fostering, and protection;
3. Implementing standardization, analysis, evaluation, and reporting in the field of language and literature development, fostering, and protection;
4. Implementing Agency administration; and
5. Implementing other functions assigned by the Minister.

== Organizational Structure ==
The organizational structure of the Language Development and Fostering Agency consists of:

1. Secretariat of the Language Development and Fostering Agency;
2. Center for Language and Literature Development and Protection;
3. Center for Language and Literature Fostering; and
4. Center for Language and Literature Empowerment.

== Products ==
- KBBI (Big Indonesian Dictionary)
- Improved Indonesian Spelling (Fifth Edition)
- Indonesian Spelling Editing Application (SIPEBI), offline software that automatically edits or corrects Indonesian text.
- PASTI (Padanan Istilah), a site that provides equivalents for terms from various foreign-language fields in Indonesian.
- Dictionary Sign System
- Ensiklopedia of Indonesian Literature
- Dictionary of terms - a special dictionary for basic science fields, including (physics, chemistry, mathematics, and biology); applied sciences (medicine, philosophy, law, language, literature, mass communication, education, religion, etc.). This dictionary of terms is a collaboration between the Language Center, experts in the field of science, and the Brunei Darussalam-Indonesia-Malaysia Language Council (MABBIM)
- Indonesian Thematic Thesaurus as a source of equivalent words.
- A language proficiency test called UKBI (Indonesian Language Proficiency Test) and the development of teaching materials for BIPA (Indonesian for Foreign Speakers).
- A Language Bill that will establish three languages in Indonesia: regional languages as mother tongues, Indonesian as the national language, and foreign languages as sources of knowledge. The status of these three languages will be clarified through legislation and their use protected so that they do not overtake or overpower one another.
- Halo Bahasa - an Android-based Language Agency service application.

=== Bibliography ===
- Interview with the Head of the Language Center, Dr. Dendy Sugono: Language Use in the Media. Media Watch, The Habibie Center. No. 49/September 15–October 15, 2006.

== See also ==
- Kamus Besar Bahasa Indonesia, the official dictionary of the Indonesian language compiled by the Language Development and Fostering Agency
