= Kuantan Singingi Regency =

Regency in Riau, Indonesia

Kuantan Singingi Regency Kabupaten Kuantan Singingi
- Regency
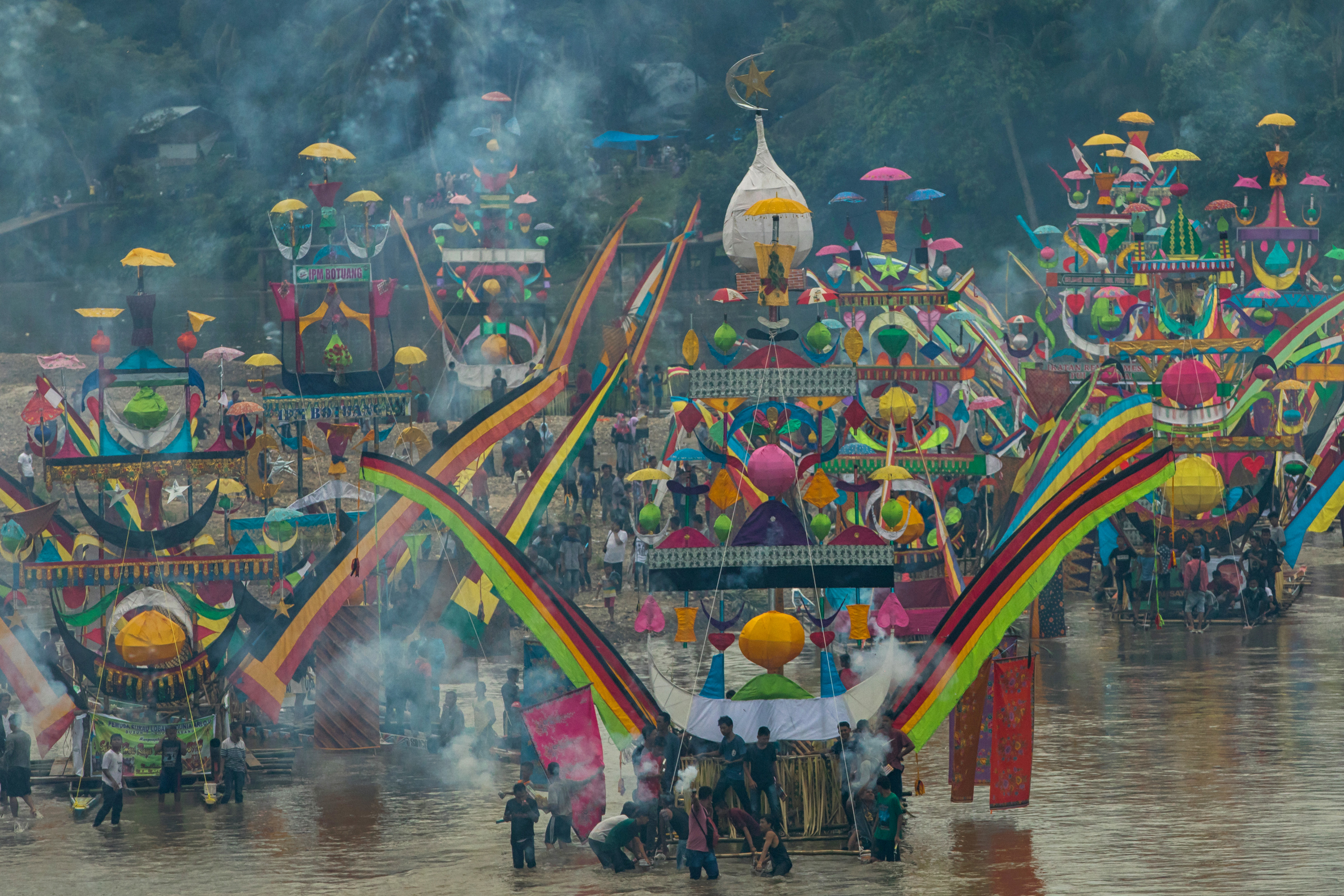
- Bagandung boat Festival, held every year along Eid al-Fitr.

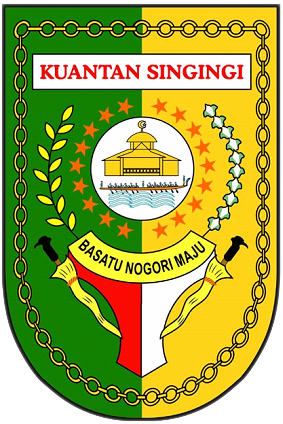
- Coat of arms

- Coordinates: 0°0′0″N 101°55′0″E
- Country: Indonesia
- Province: Riau
- Regency seat: Teluk Kuantan

Government
  - Regent: Suhardiman Amby
  - Vice Regent: Mukhlisin

Area
  - Total: 7,656.03 km^{2} (2,956.01 sq mi)

Population (2025 estimate)
  - Total: 369,718
  - Density: 48.2911/km^{2} (125.073/sq mi)
- Time zone: UTC+7 (WIB)
- Website: www.kuansing.go.id

Kuantan Singingi ([k(u)ˈwan̪t̪an siˈŋiŋi]), sometimes abbreviated as Kuansing ([k(u)ˈwansɪŋ]), is an inland regency (kabupaten) of Riau Province, Indonesia. It is located on the island of Sumatra. The regency was created on 4 October 1999 from what had been the western half of Indragiri Hulu Regency. It has an area of 7,656.03 km^{2} and had a population of 292,116 at the 2010 Census and 334,943 at the 2020 Census; the official estimate as at mid 2025 was 369,718 (comprising 187,878 males and 181,840 females). The seat of the regency is the town of Teluk Kuantan.

== Administrative districts ==
At the time of the 2010 Census, the regency was divided into twelve districts (kecamatan), but three additional districts (Pucuk Rantau, Sentajo Raya and Kuantan Hilir Seberang) have subsequently been created by the division of existing districts. They are all listed below with their areas and their populations at the 2010 Census, and the 2020 Census. together with the official estimates as at mid 2025. The table also includes the locations of the district administrative centres, the number of administrative villages in each district (totaling 218 rural desa and 11 urban kelurahan), and its post code.

Kode Wilayah	Name of District (kecamatan)	Area in km^{2}	Pop'n Census 2010	Pop'n Census 2020	Pop'n Estimate mid 2025	Admin centre	No. of villages	Post code
14.09.01	Kuantan Mudik	564.28	31,799	25,061	26,473	Lubuk Jambi	24 ^{(a)}	29564
14.09.12	Hulu Kuantan	384.40	8,066	9,252	10,378	Lubuk Ambacang	12	29568
14.09.07	Gunung Toar	165.25	12,692	13,889	14,757	Kampung Baru	14	29565
14.09.15	Pucuk Rantau	821.64	^{(b)}	10,379	13,012	Pangkalan	10	29557
14.09.03	Singingi	1,953.55	28,939	34,148	38,085	Muara Lembu	14 ^{(a)}	29563
14.09.08	Singingi Hilir	1,530.97	34,942	42,277	46,980	Koto Baru	12	29560
14.09.02	Kuantan Tengah (Central Kuantan)	270.74	52,708	51,894	57,002	Teluk Kuantan	23 ^{(c)}	29511: 29516
14.09.14	Sentajo Raya	145.70	^{(b)}	30,569	33,444	Koto Sentajo	15 ^{(d)}	29567
14.09.06	Benai	124.66	32,384	16,408	18,201	Benai	16 ^{(a)}	29566
14.09.04	Kuantan Hilir	148.77	26,021	14,176	15,220	Baserah	16 ^{(e)}	29561
14.09.09	Pangean	145.32	17,161	20,020	21,630	Pangean	17	29553
14.09.10	Logas Tanah Darat	380.34	18,955	23,341	28,043	Perhentian Luas	15	29556
14.09.13	Kuantan Hilir Seberang	114.29	^{(b)}	11,357	11,656	Koto Rajo	14	29562
14.09.05	Cerenti	456.00	14,058	15,557	17,336	Cerenti	13 ^{(f)}	29555
14.09.11	Inuman	450.01	14,391	16,615	17,501	Inuman	14	29569
	Totals	7,656.03	292,116	334,943	369,718	Teluk Kuantan	229	

Notes: (a) including one kelurahan (the district admin centre as named). (b) the 2010 populations of these three new districts are included in the figures for the districts from which they were cut out.
(c) including 3 kelurahan (Pasar Taluk, Simpang Tiga and Sungai Jering). (d) including one kelurahan (Beringin Jaya). (e) including 2 kelurahan (Pasar Baru and Pasar Usang). (f) including 2 kelurahan (Pasar Cerenti and Koto Peraku).

== Tourism ==
The most attractive tourist event is the Pacu Jalur which is held in every August annually. The Pacu Jalur is a kind of boat race.

Cultural Ambassador of Riau, 11-year-old Rayyan Arkan Dhika, is from Kuantan Singingi Regency. He is well-known for being the child dancing at the front of the boat in the viral "Boat Kid Aura Farming" video which showcased the Pacu Jalur race.
