= List of festivals in Indonesia =

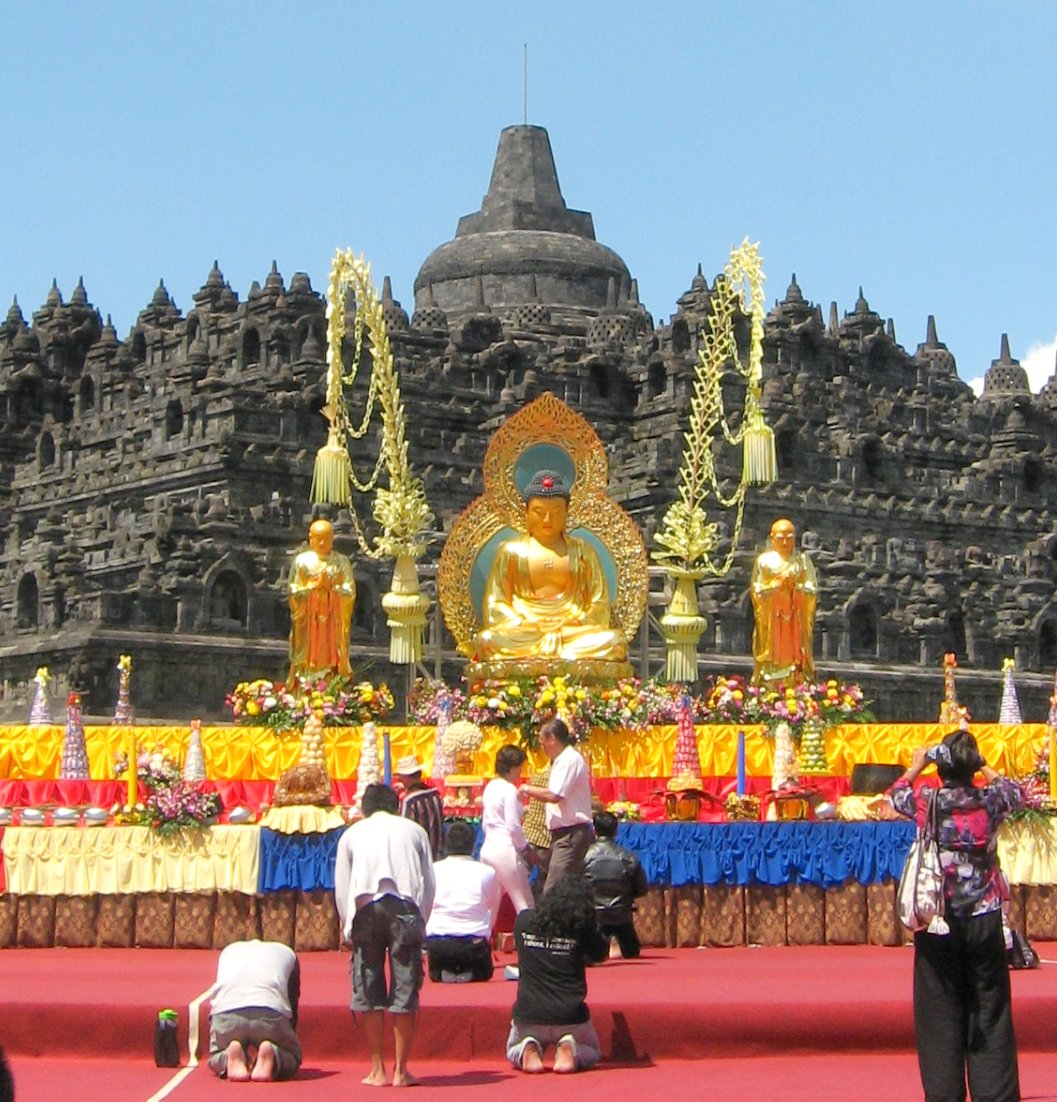
Waisak (Vesak) day celebration at Borobudur, Central Java.

Below is a list of festivals in Indonesia. The list is divided based on their respective calendar.

== Changing date ==
- Indonesia Menari
- Festival Baleo, Lembata
- Ngayogjazz, Yogyakarta
- Gawai Dayak, West Kalimantan
- Indonesian Film Festival, Jakarta
- Jakarta Fashion & Food Festival, Jakarta
- Jazz Goes to Campus, University of Indonesia, Depok
- Jember Fashion Carnival, Jember
- Lombok Full Moon Festival, Gili Trawangan (every full moon)
- Makepung, Bali
- Mentawai Festival, Mentawai Islands Regency, West Sumatra
- Nihon no Matsuri, Telkom Institute of Technology
- Q! Film Festival
- Tomohon International Flower Festival, Tomohon, North Sulawesi

== Gregorian calendar ==
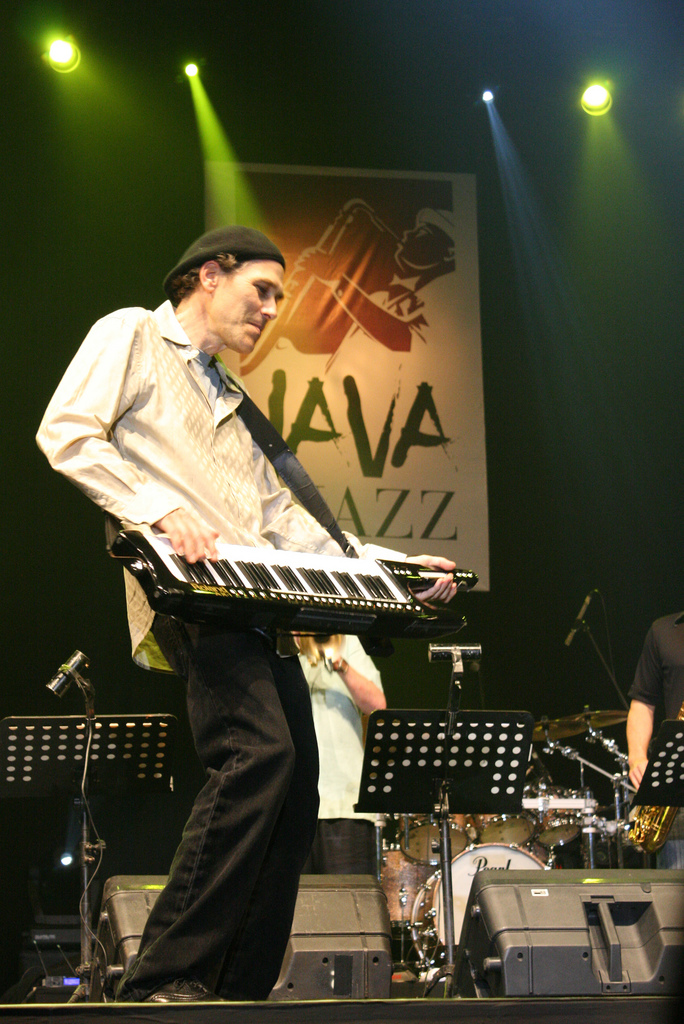
Gregg Karukas performance in 2008 Java Jazz Festival, reputedly largest jazz festival in the southern hemisphere.

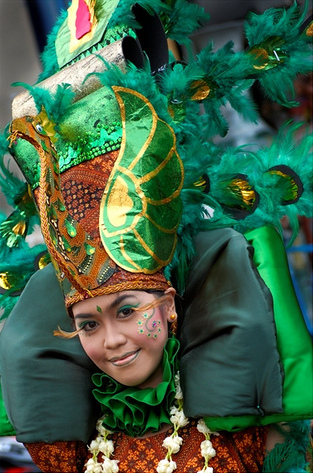
Solo Batik Carnival, one of the largest extravagant costumes procession in Indonesia.

- January
  - Festival Manulude, Sangihe Islands Regency, North Sulawesi
  - Maudu Lompoa, Takalar
- February
  - Bau Nyale Putri Mandalika, Kuta Beach, Lombok (between February and March)
  - Pasola, 4 villages in West Sumba (between February and March)
- March
  - Bali Spirit Festival, Bali (March)
  - Jakarta International Java Jazz Festival, Jakarta (early March)
  - Megou Pak, Tulangbawang, Lampung
  - Buleleng Folk Festival, Singaraja, Bali (March–April)
- April
  - Festival Legu Gam, Ternate (early April until April 13)
  - Seba Baduy, Lebak, Banten
- May
  - Festival Teluk Jailolo, West Halmahera
  - Unduh-unduh, Mojowarno, East Java (early May)
  - Art Jog, Taman Budaya Yogyakarta (early May until June 4)
- June
  - Festival Danau Sentani, Jayapura, Papua
  - Festival Malioboro, Yogyakarta (June)
  - Festival Danau Toba, North Sumatra (June–July)
  - Bali Arts Festival (Festival Seni Bali), Bali (June)
  - Jakarta anniversary festivals (June 22):
    - Jakarnaval
    - Kemang Festival
  - Solo Batik Carnival, Surakarta (end of June)
- July
  - Betawi Cultural Festival, Jakarta
  - Pasa Harau Art & Culture Festival, Harau Valley, West Sumatra
  - Bali Kite Festival, Bali (July)
  - Erau, Tenggarong (July since 2009)
  - Krakatau Festival, Lampung (July–October)
- August
  - Karapan sapi, Madura (August–October)
  - Parade Kuda Kosong, Cianjur (17 August)
- September
  - Festival Lembah Baliem, Papua (September)
  - Festival Teluk Ambon, Ambon Bay
- October
  - Festival Hantu Gadu, Kepuk village, Jepara (12 October)
  - Jogja Java Carnival, Yogyakarta (October)
  - Kuta Karnival, Kuta, Bali (around 12 October)
  - Reyog Jazz, Ponorogo
  - Banyuwangi Festival, Banyuwangi
  - Maratua Jazz & Dive Fiesta, Berau East Borneo
  - Festival Pesona Meti Kei, Maluku
- November
  - Djakarta Artmosphere, Jakarta (20 November)
  - Jakarta International Film Festival, Jakarta (around November–December)
  - Perang Topat, western Lombok
  - Petik Laut, Banyuwangi
  - Mahakam Jazz Fiesta, Samarinda
  - Ngayogjazz, Yogyakarta
- December
  - Iraw Tengkayu, Tarakan (December, held biannually)
  - Lovely December, Tana Toraja
  - New Year's Eve (December 31)

== Lunar calendar ==
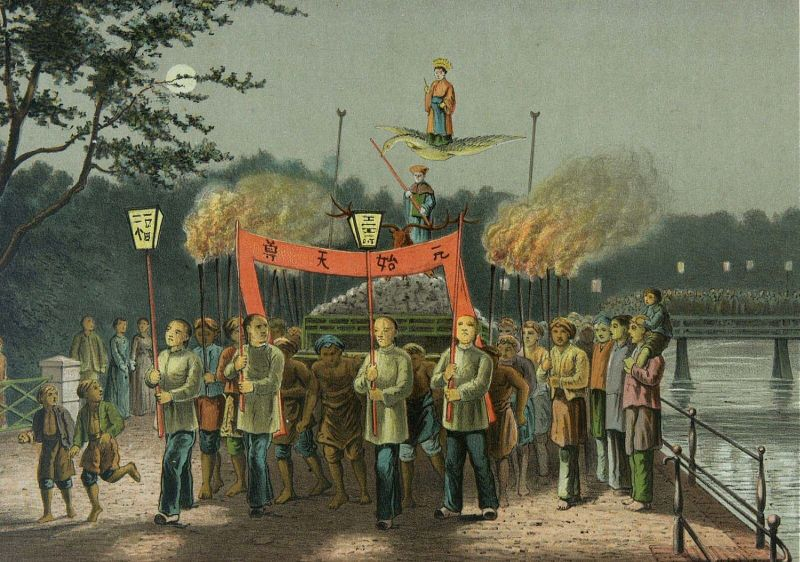
Cap Go Meh feast in 19th century Dutch Indies.

Traditional Chinese festivals in Indonesia are usually known under their Hokkien names, with several dialects exist some cities e.g. Medan and Bagansiapiapi.

Date (Chinese calendar)	English name	Indonesian name	Mandarin name	Hokkien name	Hakka name	Remarks
1st date of 1st month	Chinese New Year	Tahun Baru Imlek	農曆新年 农历新年 (Nónglì Xīnnián)			1st day of 1st month of Chinese calendar. Public holiday since 2003
15th date of 1st month	Lantern Festival	Festival Lampion	元宵節 元宵节 (Yuánxiāo Jié)	十五暝 (Cha̍p Gō͘ Mê)		Festival marking the last day of Chinese New Year celebration.
15th day after vernal equinox	Qingming Festival	Festival Qingming	清明節 清明节 (Qīngmíng Jié)	清明節 清明节 (Chheng Bêng Chat)		
5th day of 5th month	Dragon Boat Festival	Peh Cun	端午节 端午節 (Duānwǔ Jié)	扒船 (Pê Chûn)	端陽 (Tôn-yòng)	
	Bakar Tonggang Ceremony	Ritual Bakar Tonggang	儀式燃料的駁船 仪式燃料的驳船 (Yíshì Ránliào de Bóchuán)	五月十六日 (Gō͘ Go̍eh Cha̍p La̍k Ji̍t)		
15th night of the 7th month	Ghost Festival	Festival Cioko	鬼節 鬼节 (Guǐ Jié)			

== Vedic (lunisolar) calendar ==
- Vaisakha
  - Waisak (full moon of Vaisakha)

== Islamic/Javanese (lunar) calendar ==
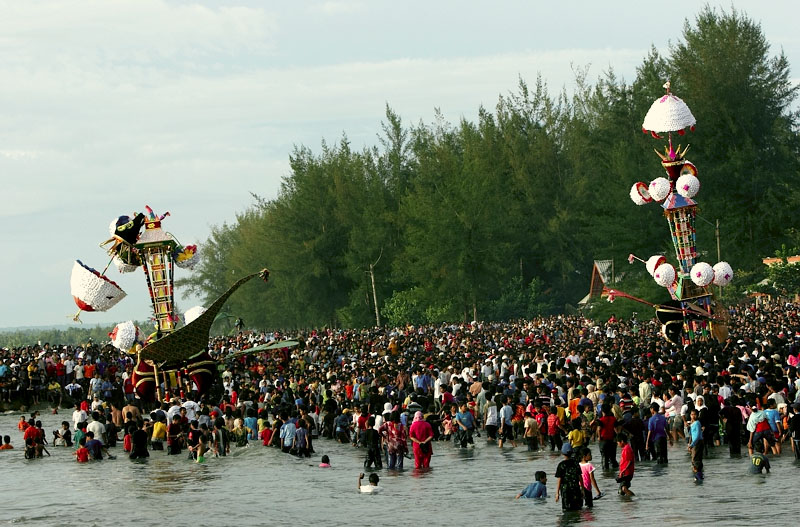
Tabuik is the local manifestation of Muharram remembrance.

- Muharram
  - Grebeg Suro, Ponorogo (1 Muharram)
  - Hajat Sasih Ceremony, Kampung Naga (Muharam, Rabi' al-awwal, Sha'aban, and Dhu al-Qi'dah)
  - Tabut, Bengkulu (1-10 Muharram)
  - Tabuik, West Sumatra (10 Muharram)
- Safar
  - Rabu Pungkasan, Bantul (last Wednesday of Safar)
- Rabi' al-awwal
  - Sekaten, Surakarta and Yogyakarta (5-12 Rabi' al-awwal)
  - Muludan Keraton Kasultanan Cirebon, Cirebon (12 Rabi' al-awwal)
  - Ampyang Maulid, Kudus (12 Rabi' al-awwal)
  - Nyadar, Desa Pinggir Papas. (3 times after 12 Rabi' al-awwal)
- Jumada al-thani
  - Serak Gulo, Padang (1 Jumada al-thani)
- Rajab
  - Uler-Uler Ritual, Jungsemi village, Demak (Wage Friday in Rajab)
- Sha'aban
  - Pesta Baratan, Jepara (15 Sha'ban)
- Ramadan
  - First of Ramadan celebrations:
    - Dhandhangan, Kudus
    - Dugderan, Semarang
    - Megengan, Demak

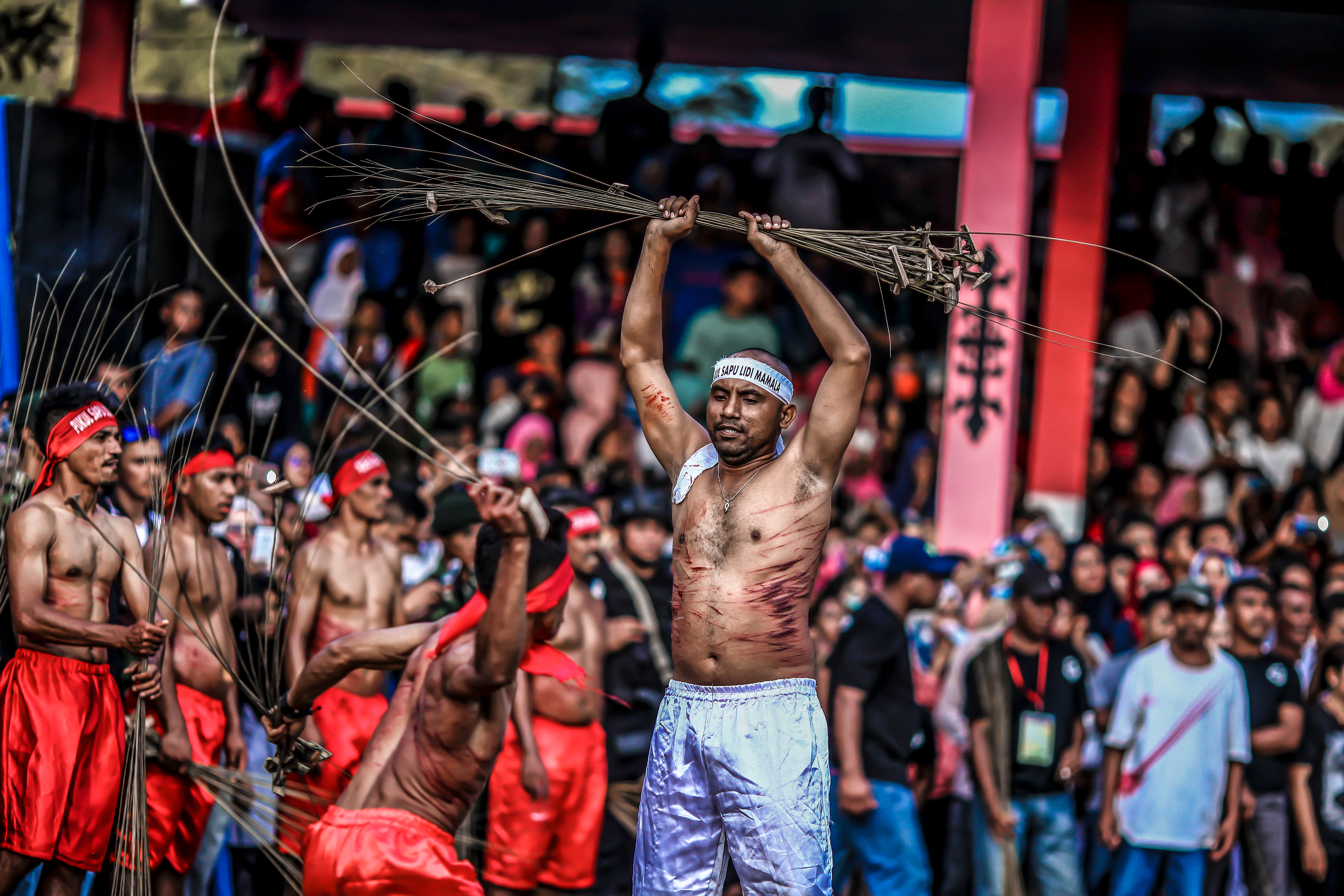
Pukul menyapu

- Syawal
  - Lebaran (1 Syawal)
  - Barong Ider Bumi, Banyuwangi (2 Syawal)
  - Pukul Manyapu, Mamala and Morella village, Maluku (7 Syawal)
  - Pesta Lomban, Jepara (8 Syawal)
- Dhu al-Hijjah
  - Perang Obor, Tegal Sambi Village, Jepara (Pahing Monday to eve of Pon Tuesday)
  - Grebeg Besar Demak, Demak (10 Dhu al-Hijjah)

== Other ==
=== Balinese calendar ===
This list includes festivals which don't follow any of the previous calendars, such as the Balinese pawukon and saka calendar.

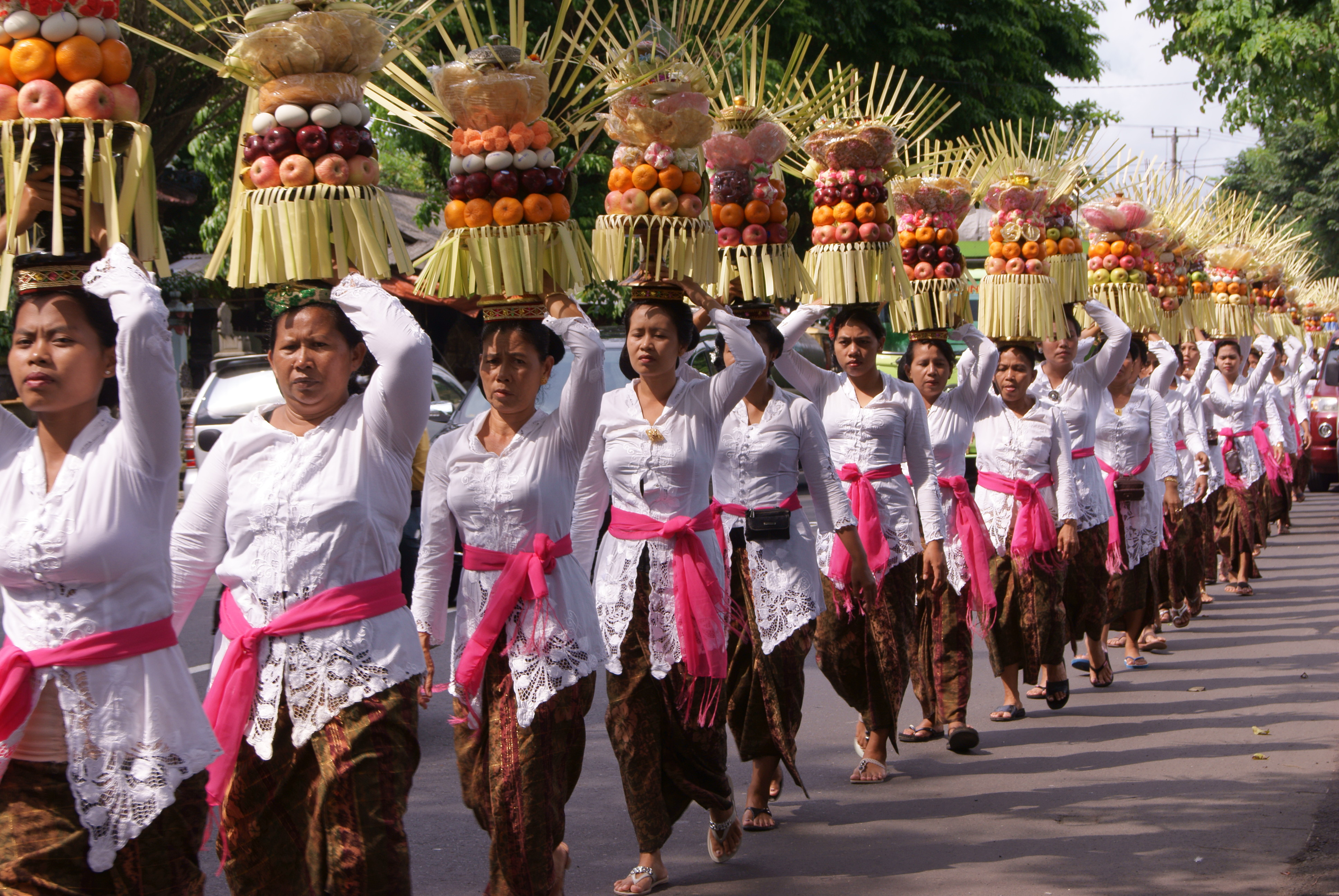
Odalan procession in Bali.

- Galungan and Kuningan
- Odalan (temple anniversary in Bali, held once every Pawukon year)
- Nyepi (held once every Saka year)

=== Hindu calendar ===
- Deepavali
- Holi

=== Tamil calendar ===
- Thaipusam

=== Tengger calendar ===
- Yadnya Kasada
