= Pacu Jalur =

Traditional canoe racing in Sumatra, Indonesia

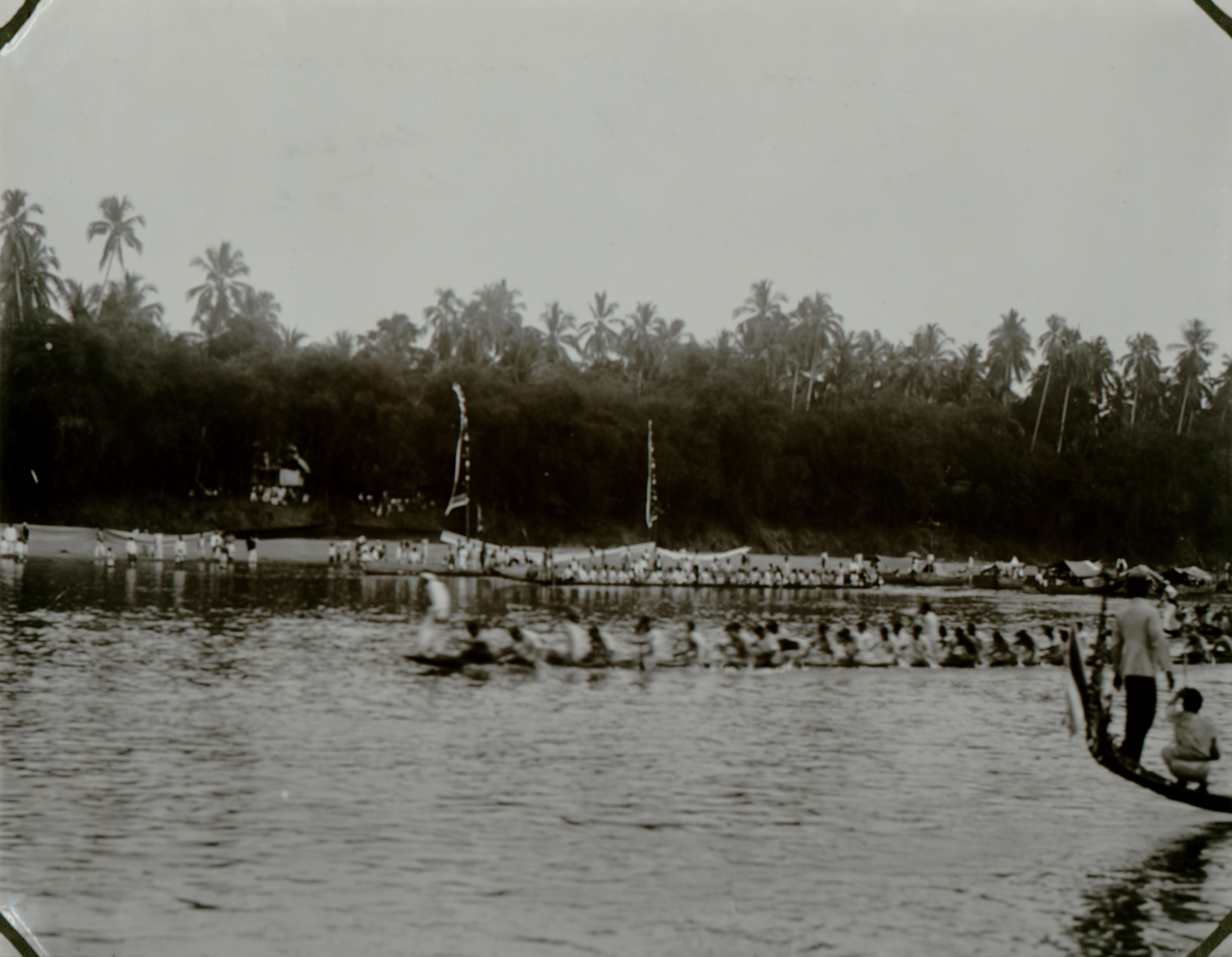
- The Pacu Jalur took place in Indragiri River, c. 1900s (photo extracted from the digital collection of The Royal Netherlands Institute of Southeast Asian and Caribbean Studies)
- Nicknames: Pacu Jalua (in Minangkabau); Pachu Jalugh (in Minangkabau); Patjoe Djaloer (in Petjo); Pacu Perahu (in Indonesian); Kanorace van Koeantan (in Dutch); Kanorace op de Batang Koeantan (in Dutch); Kanorace op de Inderagiri (in Dutch); Kuansing Boat Festival
- First played: c. 1600s (17th century CE)

Characteristics
- Team members: Teams
- Mixed-sex: Yes

Presence
- Country or region: Indragiri River, Sumatra (Indonesia)

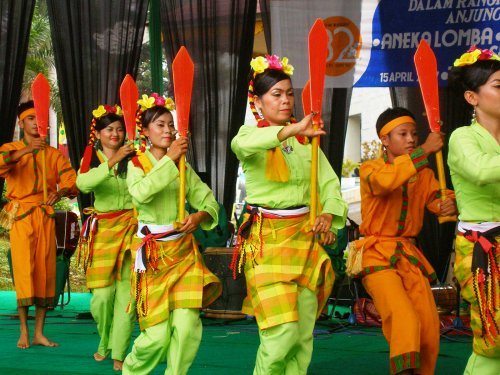
The 2007 Pacu Jalur opening ceremony – the female dancer performers (matrilineal) braided and waist-tied with triwarna melayu, representing its Melayu heritage roots.

Pacu Jalur (old spelling: Patjoe Djaloer; from Malay Pacu Jalua 'boat race', pronounced [ˈpat͡ʃu d͡ʒaˈluə̯]; pə-CHOO-jə-LOOR) also known as Pachu Jalugh is a traditional and cultural watercraft-based Pacu (lit. 'Melayu race') originated from upper course of the Indragiri River in Sumatra region of Tanah Datar and its surrounding areas (including Sijunjung, Kuantan Singingi and Indragiri Hulu – originally part of the native Eastern Minangkabau realm). (Note: nowadays politically annexed by Riau (since 1999), but it did not change the fact about its Minangkabau nativeness) One of the most significant Pacu Jalur series of events held annually under the Pacu Jalur Festival at Teluk Kuantan district on Sumatra.

Since 2014, the traditions, knowledge, cultural customs, biocentrism awareness, and the practices of Pacu Jalur officially recognized and regarded by the Ministry of Education, Culture, Research, and Technology of Republic Indonesia as integral part of the National Intangible Cultural Heritage of Indonesia. As the effort to preserve these cultural heritage, the government of Indonesia support the Pacu Jalur Festival which held annually in Kuantan Singingi and promote its importance for the wider public both nationwide and international, the winner team of Pacu Jalur usually will also have a chance to be elected as the national athlete of Indonesia to represent Indonesia in the international boat racing events.

In 2022, the Pacu Jalur art (illustrated by a Bandung-based Sundanese artist, Wastana Haikal), selected as the Google Doodle of-the-day, a special logo alteration on Google's homepage intended to commemorate the Indonesian Independence Day celebrated on August 17 annually.

== Nomenclature ==
The pacu jalur is an Eastern Minangkabau-origin term; the pacu literally means "race", (Note: see Pacu Jawi for comparison) meanwhile the word jalur refers to "(elongated) boat". In simple sense, the Pacu Jalur could be roughly translated as "boat race" or "canoe race".

Depends on Minangkabau dialectal differences, the Pacu Jalur might spelt differently, such as Pacu Jalua (in Standard Minangkabau), Pacu Jalugh or Pachu Jalugh (in another Eastern Minangkabau), or even Patjoe Djaloer (in Petjo). According to colonial manuscripts written in Dutch, these cultural traditions were better known by its nicknames, such as Kanorace op de Inderagiri (lit. 'Canoe race of Indragiri') or Kanorace op de Batang Koeantan (lit. 'Batang Kuantan canoe race').

== History ==
One of the earliest written references for Pacu Jalur specifically mentioned in the 17th century native Sumatran manuscript of Tambo Minangkabau (lit. 'Minangkabau chronicle').

According to the oral tradition of the local community, the Pacu Jalur were initially used as a means of transport along the river of Indragiri (upstream region) all the way down to the Cerenti sub-district at the mouth of Batang Kuantan. As ground transportation was not yet developed during that time, the route was actually used as an important means of transport for villagers, mainly used as a means of transporting crops, such as local fruits and sugar cane, and serves to transport about 40-60 people. Later, these elongated dug-out boats are purposely decorated by the local cultural elements that might include the heads of snakes, crocodiles, tigers and sometimes added with Minangkabau umbrellas (payuang). As the time goes by, its function shifted from being a mere transport means for people to a splendid royal barge. The water-route that usually used as the transport or exchange goods-route gradually transformed as the sociocultural identity for Minangkabaus of Rantau Kuantan to hold the festivals. Moreover, according to the written historical records, the route also served as the royals' route to welcome the honorable guests of kings (and later sultans) who wanted to visit the Rantau Kuantan area.

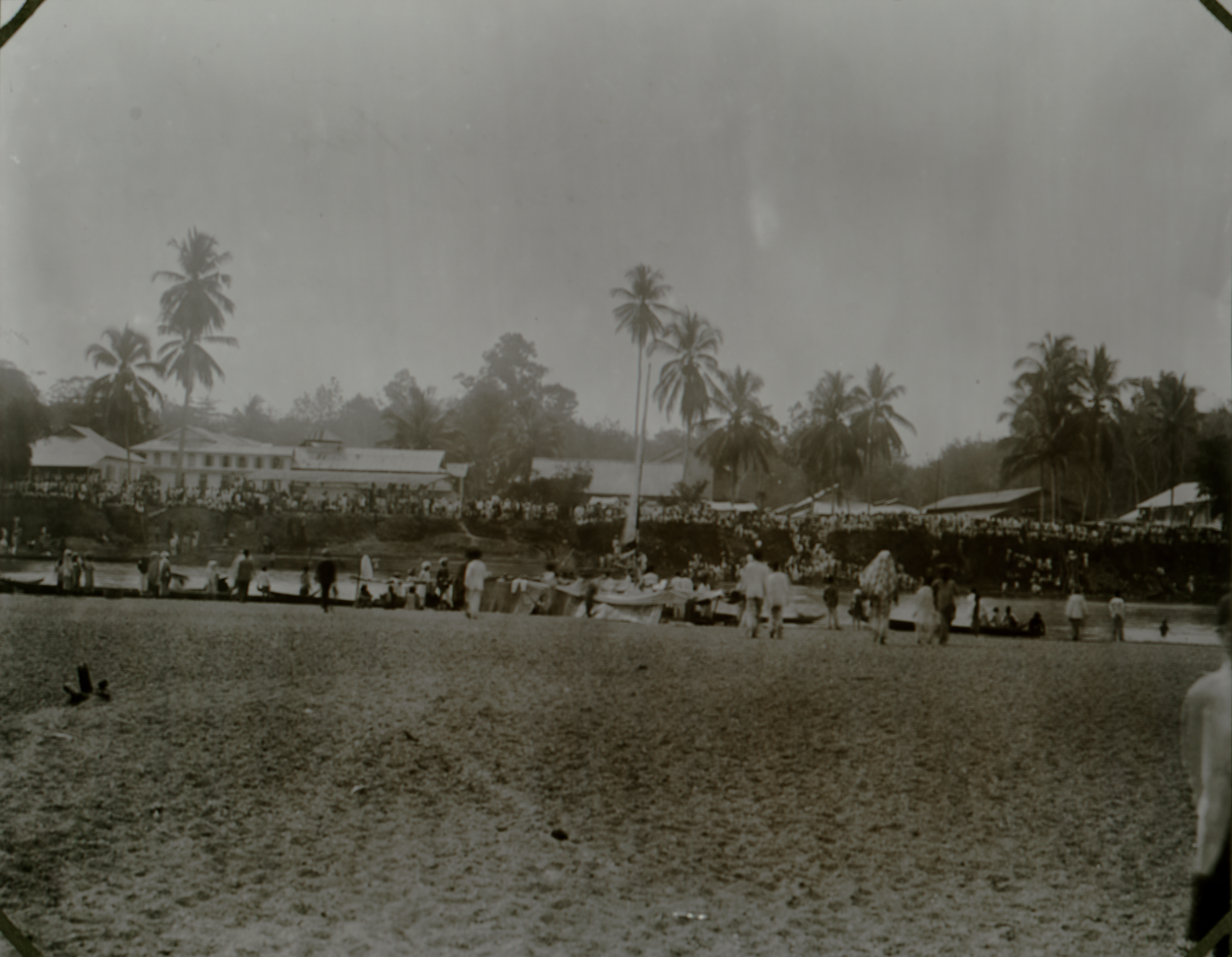
The Pacu Jalur Festival and its spectators in Taluk district, c. 1900s

During the Dutch East Indies administration, which began in the Kuantan area around 1905, the Pacu Jalur was held annually on August 31 to commemorate Queen Wilhelmina’s birthday. The event often lasted several days until a winner was determined. Each of the winner from first to fourth place was given a Tonggol, decorated ceremonial flag larger than a Marawa that has rank number written on it and used as a trophy. The event was postponed during World War II and Indonesian National Revolution. Pacu Jalur was held again in 1950s as political and economic situation was stable enough for people to commemorate the Independence Day of Indonesia.

Later on, to preserve this cultural tradition, the government of Indonesia includes the Pacu Jalur Festival in annual national tourist calendar event of Indonesia, which usually held around late August.

In 2025, a video of the national Pacu Jalur on the Kuantan went viral on the internet. The video, often titled Boat Kid Aura Farming, featured the kid dancer at the head of the boat (Tukang Tari, or Anak Coki) wearing Teluk Belanga, edited to the tune of "Young Black & Rich" by American rapper Melly Mike. It was reposted and recreated multiple times. French football club Paris Saint-Germain posted its own rendition on TikTok on 1 July and garnered more than 7 millions in 10 days. The trend was followed by AC Milan football club, Travis Kelce, and Alex Albon, amongst others. The boy featured on the video, Rayyan Arkan Dhika from Tuah Koghi Dubalang Ghajo team, was 11 years old at the time of filming. He was later named a cultural ambassador of Riau, where he came from for his roles in promoting the tradition to the international recognition.

== Boat ==
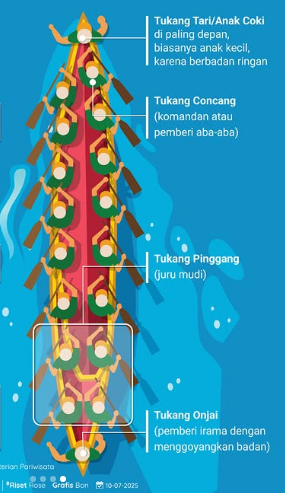
The anatomy of jalur ship, used in Pacu Jalur boatrace.

"Jalur" is a type of boat made from a single whole tree trunk — it’s not split, cut into pieces, or joined together. Its characteristics are sturdiness, strength, sleekness, and artistic form, so when racing, there’s no worry about it breaking; it moves swiftly and looks pleasing to the eye. A jalur consists of the following parts : luan (prow), talingo (front ear), panggar (seat), pornik (hull), ruang timbo (bailing area), talingo balakang (rear ear), kamudi (steering place / helmsman’s spot), lambai-lambai / salambayuang (handholds for the tukang onjor), pandaro (jalur core/seed), ular-ular (rowers’ seat), salambayuang (the carved tip of the jalur), pengayak (rower), panimbo (bailer scoop) The salambayuang and the sides of the jalur's body are usually carved and brightly painted. The motifs vary, such as vines, geometric shapes, waves, birds, and others, even airplanes. Each Jalur boat has a name, for example: Naga Sakti, Gajah Tunggal, Rawang Udang, Kompe Berangin, Bomber, Pelita, Orde Baru, and so on. The making of a jalur goes through quite a long process, which is as follows:

1. To draw up a work plan, a village meeting (musyawarah or rapek kampung) is first held, attended by various community elements such as traditional leaders, intellectuals, women, and youth, led by a village elder, usually a customary leader. If everyone agrees to make a jalur, then the next steps are decided.
2. Choosing the tree. The tree must meet certain quality requirements (type, size, etc.), especially its magical or spiritual weight. The type chosen is usually banio, kulim kuyiang, or another suitable wood; it must be straight, about 25–30 meters long, 1–2 meters in diameter, and have a mambang (a kind of spirit). It must be ensured that, once finished, the jalur can carry 40–80 rowers. In this selection process, the role of the pawang (spiritual guide) is vital. Once the tree is chosen, a semah ceremony is held so the tree does not "disappear" supernaturally.
3. Felling the tree. After the pawang performs the semah, the tree is felled with axes and adzes. Branches and twigs are removed.
4. Cutting the ends. The cleaned log is trimmed at the ends to certain measurements matching the planned length of the jalur. Then the bark is peeled off, and the log is measured and divided into parts: prow, "ears" hull, and so on using string tools.
5. Shaping the front (pandadan). The upper front part (dada) of the log is leveled, running from base to tip.
6. Hollowing (mancaruk). The inside is carved out evenly along its length.
7. Smoothing (manggiliang). The upper sides are smoothed to form the rim of the boat and begin shaping the outer upper part.
8. Turning over (manggaliak). The log is flipped so that the part that was on top is now underneath, allowing the outer hull to be shaped and slimmed freely. This requires careful calculation to keep all parts equally thick. Measuring is done by drilling small holes that are later plugged with pegs.
9. Flipping back (manggaliak). The log is turned upright again.
10. Forming the prow and rudder.
11. Hauling the half-finished jalur back to the village, accompanied by the maelo jalur ceremony. Community teamwork is crucial here.
12. Finishing touches. The boat is smoothed, carved, and then lifted onto a rack (ram account pian) and smoked.
13. Launching the Jalur boats into the river, which completes the boat-making process and is also marked by a ceremonial event.

== Race ==
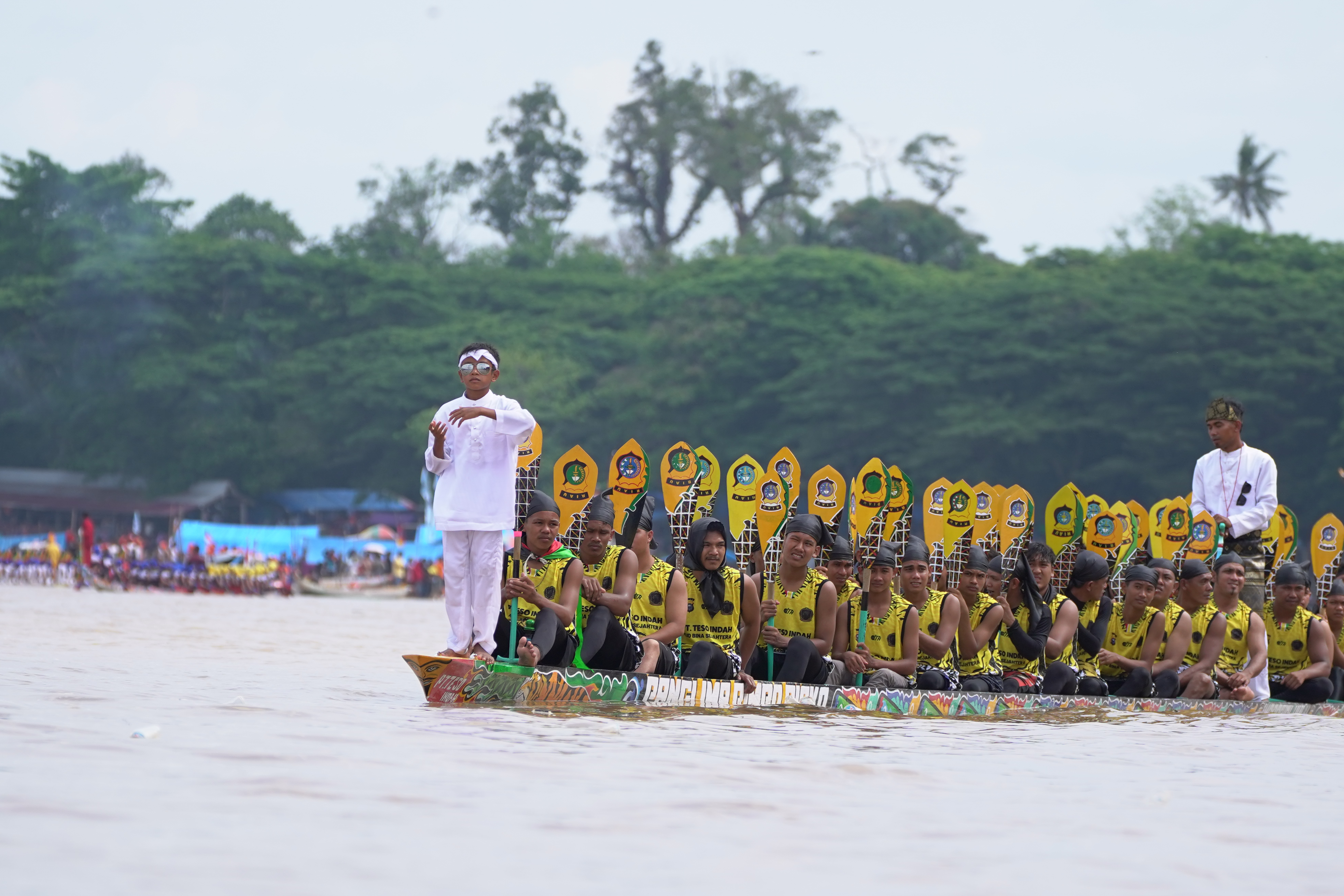
Team of Panglimo Rimbo Piako participating in Pacu Jalur

Before the main event of "Pacu Jalur 'is started, it usually held entertainment performances like singing and dancing performances to entertain all participants and surrounding communities. Nowadays, prior to the festival, smaller paddling events were held in four districts, followed by a traditional mini route held at Tepian Narosa Teluk Kuantan. The racetrack follows the flow of Batang Kuantan River, with a track length of about 1 km marked by six piles. The wooden boat taking part in the competition usually have a length of 25 to 40 meters and the width of the middle section of approximately 1.3 ms / d 1.5 m. The crew for each boat varies from 50 to 60 people. Each of the crew has his own task, there is the commander who shouts out instructions, the helmsman, another one leads the boat by dancing from left to right, while another provides the "music" to provide rhythm and ensure regularity to paddlers. All these are in order that the boat moves fast forward in the right direction, provide balance, and paddlers follow the same rhythm.

=== Previous winners (listed by boat name) ===
Pacu Jalur 2025
Rank	Cerenti Series (June 13–15)	Hulu Kuantan Series (June 20–22)	Pangean Series (July 4–7)	Central Kuantan Series (July 18–20)	Baserah Series (August 7–10)	Teluk Kuantan Final Series (August 20–24)
1	Sari Jadi Gementar Alam	Cakaran Garuda Muda	Tuah Keramat Bukit Embun	Lompatan Keramat Panjang	Tuah Keramat Bukit Embun	Bintang Emas Cahaya Intan
2	Panglimo Itam Bintang Nagoghi	Batu Lompatan Harimau Kompe	Panglimo Hitam Bintang Naghohi	Batu Lompatan Harimau Kompe	Alam Cahayo Tuah Nagoghi	Tuah Datuk Keramat Imbang di Alam
3	Toduang Itom Dubalang Sati	Sang Ratu Helmina	Alam Cahayo Tuah Nagoghi	Sari Jadi Gementar Alam	Langkah Siluman Buayo Danau	Panglimo Rimbo Piako
4	Olang Buas	Halilintar Gelombang Cahaya Putih	Tuah Putri Kuntum Bunga Andini	Sang Ratu Helmina	Tuah Keramat Sialang Soko	Buayo Danau
5	Putri Bungsu Sialang Puako	Toduang Biso Rimbo Piako	Singa Ngarai	Toduang Biso Rimbo Piako	Sari Jadi Gementar Alam	Singa Ngarai
6	Lancang Kuning Rantau Kuantan	Palimo Olang Putie	Toduang Biso Rimbo Piako	Putri Anggun Sibiran Tulang	Putri Kumayang Linduang Daun	Nago Sati Paboun
7	Batu Hijau Tuah Negeri	Endang Rumus	Singa Kuantan	Lancang Kuning Rantau Kuantan	Cempaka Kuantan	Untung Bertuah
8	Siluman Ulagh Bidai Lubuk Patin	Rajo Tunggal Rimbo Binuang	Pangeran Fortuna	Buayo Danou	Sultan Muda	Ghajo Siluman Sungai Tonam
9	Laskar Mudo Parisai Nagori	Putri Anggun Sibiran Tulang	Rajo Tunggal	Pendekar Kayangan Tuah Nagori	Keramat Jubah Merah	Limbago Sati Rantau Kuantan
10	Rajo Bujang	Nago Sati	Raja Laut	Pendekar Hulu Bukit Tabandang	Pematang Putui Rajo Bukik Bunian	Samurai Jopang Bukik Tantunggang

== Notable Pacu Jalur boats ==
- Bomber – of Siberakun Village, Benai District. Record holder of the champion titles of Pacu Jalur.
- Putri Anggun Sibiran Tulang – of Banjar Padang Village, Kuantan Mudik District. Pacu Jalur champion of Narosa Riverbank, Teluk Kuantan, in August 2024.
- Pandan Baiduri – of Kampung Pulau Village, Rengat District, Indragiri Hulu. Record holder of champion titles of Pacu Jalur outside of Kuantan Singingi.
- Siposan Rimbo (nicknamed "General") – of Pauh Angit Village, Pangean District. Holder of four champion titles, having won three of them consecutively from 2016 to 2018
- Tuah Koghi Dubalang Ghajo – of Pintu Gobang Kari Village, Central Kuantan District. A video of the boat's Tukang Tari (young dancer on the bow that gives spirit to the oarsmen), Rayyan Arkan Dhika, set to the hip-hop single "Young Black & Rich" by Melly Mike, went viral on the Internet in July 2025. The charismatic dance was widely imitated and brought Pacu Jalur to the attention of millions of viewers globally.

== See also ==
- Pacu Jawi — another traditional Minangkabau race involving bulls
- Pacu Itiak — another traditional Minangkabau race involving ducks
- Vallam Kali - traditional boat race in Kerala, India.
