= Karapan sapi =

Traditional bull racing festival in Indonesia

Karapan sapi Kerrabhân sapè
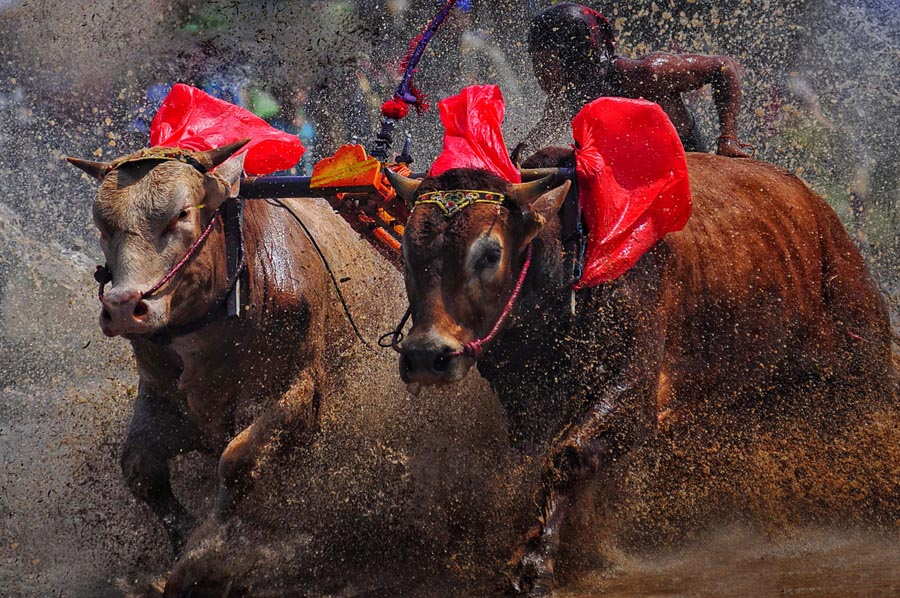
- Karapan sapi festivities on Madura
- First played: Indonesia (Madura)

Characteristics
- Team members: 1-2 players
- Type: Outdoor

Presence
- Olympic: None

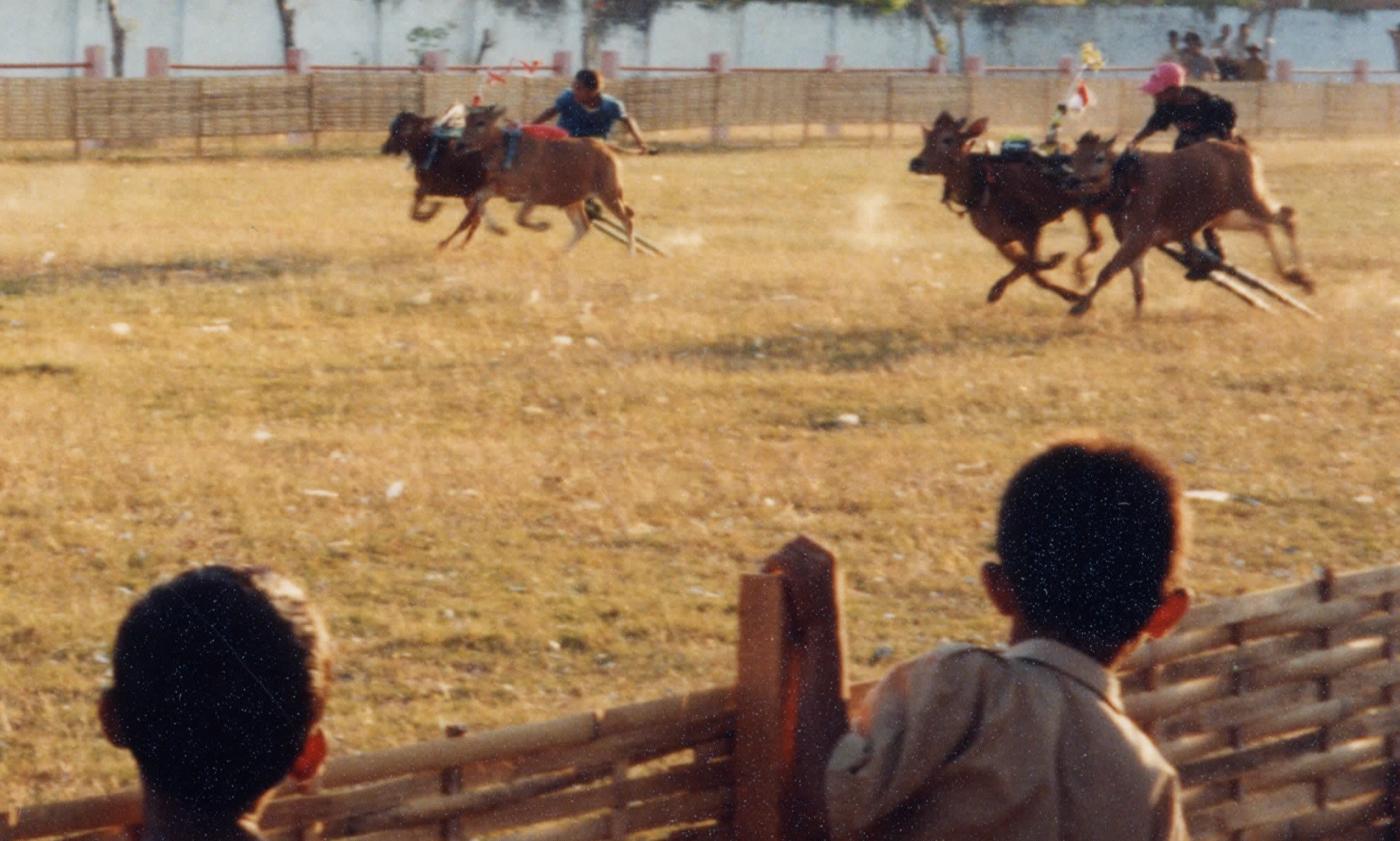
A race in 1999

Karapan sapi (Madurese: Kerrabhân sapè) is a traditional bull racing festival on the Indonesian island of Madura. Every year from about July through October, local bulls are yoked to wooden skids and raced for 130 meters (430 ft), similar to a chariot race. These races are held in several places throughout the season, and a final trophy race held in Pamekasan. The bulls participating in the event are adorned with gold and other decorations, and the event is sometimes accompanied by Gamelan music, food, and wagers on the outcome of the race. A depiction of the festival was featured on the reverse of the 100-rupiah coin for Indonesia from 1991 to 1998. An Indonesian stamp issued in 2009 also depicted the race, along with the Surabaya–Madura Bridge.

Kerapan sapi brujul in Probolinggo has different characteristics because it is held in muddy and waterlogged rice fields.

== Past and Present ==
There is a very striking difference between the past and present karapan sapi.

=== Karapan Sapi in the past ===
1. There is an ubo rampe and a ritual before the implementation to ask for safety accompanied by saronen music
2. Using large-bodied cows
3. Each cow is decorated as lively as possible, Keleles with beautiful wood carvings, pennant flags, to umbrellas
4. Each group of bull races is guarded by a Penjaghe who is in charge of maintaining the safety of the cows in order to avoid cheating from other participants. Usually, Penjaghe are imported from Ponorogo who is a Warok who is famous for being an expert in fighting. The penjaghe from Ponorogo often stands and dances on the karapan sapi kaleles hurdles, which shows that anyone who disturbs the cows he is guarding will deal with him. The choice of a Penjaghe from Ponorogo was not without reason, in addition to reducing the number of frauds, it also avoided retaliation from other participants if the Penjaghe was Madurese himself. It is strongly suspected that Madura's traditional clothes came from the clothes of the prison guards from Ponorogo, because the shirts and belts on Madura's traditional clothes were made in Ponorogo.

=== Karapan Sapi Now ===
1. There is no Ubo rampe or ritual, only prayer readings
2. Using small cows
3. Keleles Karapan is minimalist, there is no festive hisan
4. Penjaghe by the Madurese themselves

== Gallery ==
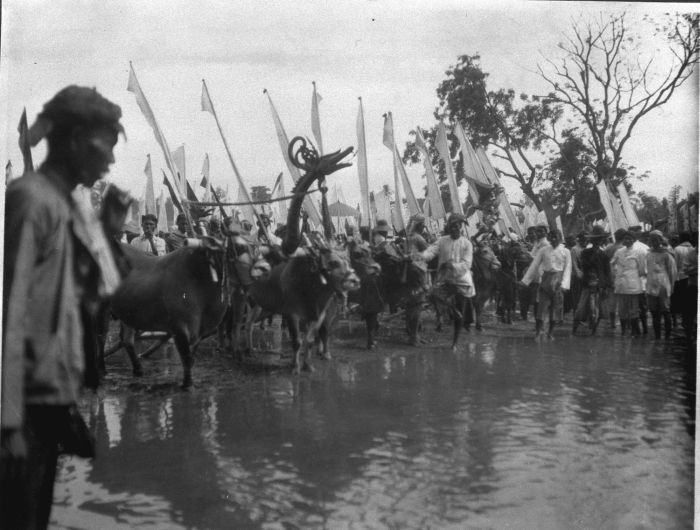

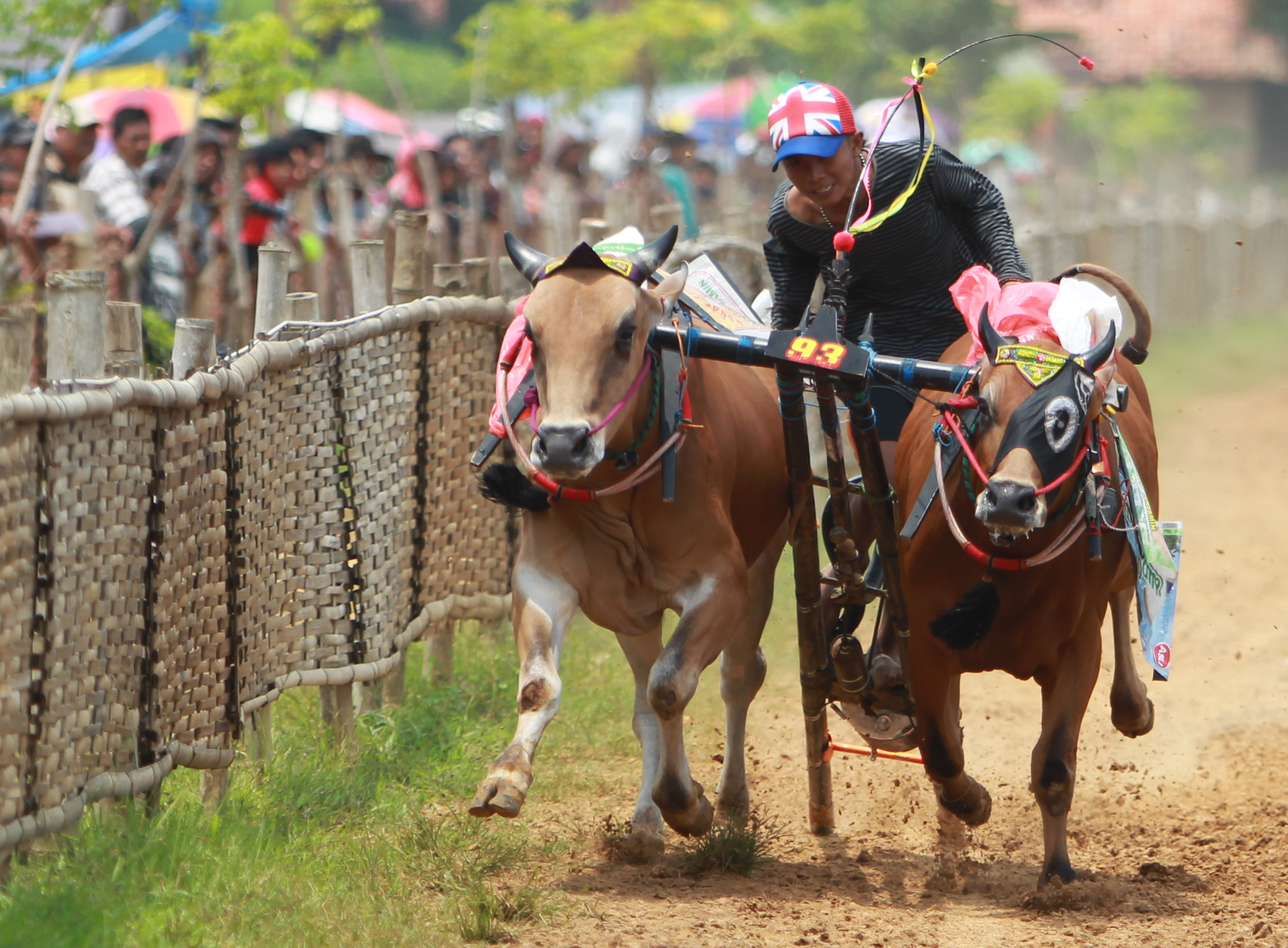

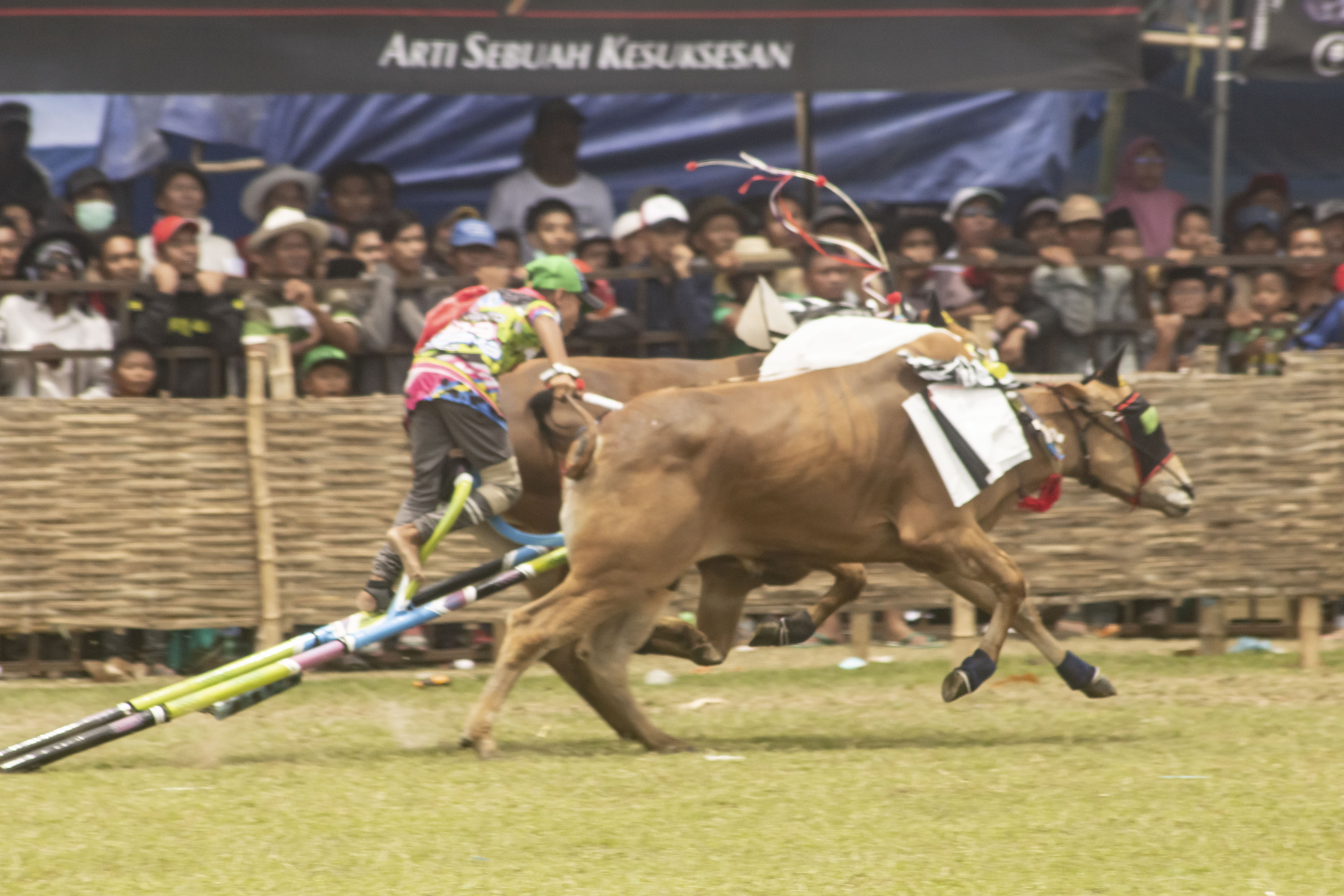

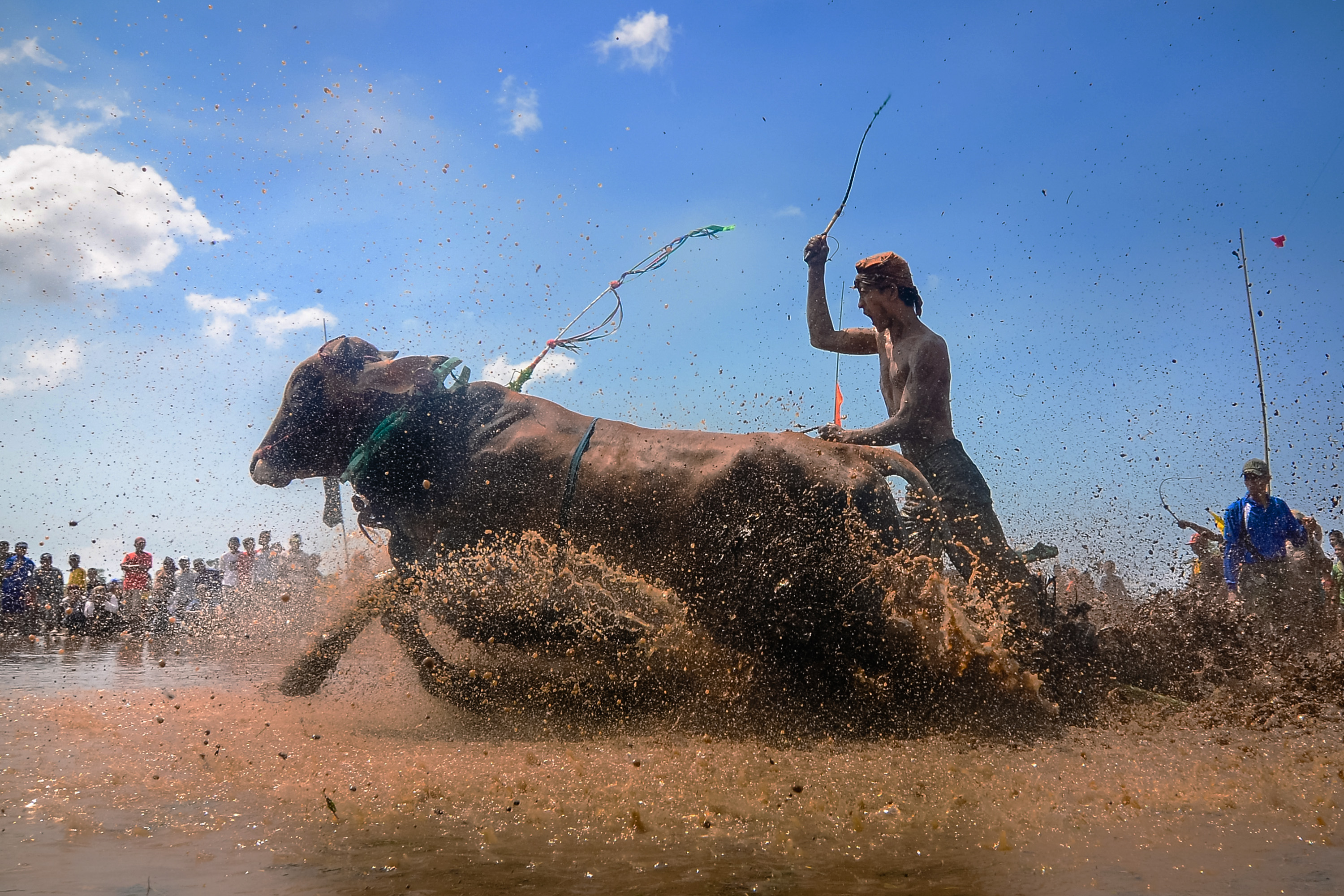

== See also ==
- Pacu jawi, bull racing from West Sumatra, Indonesia
- Sport in Indonesia
- List of festivals in Indonesia
- Buffalo racing in Kerala
- Animal racing
- Madura cattle
- Malean sampi, cattle race in West Nusa Tenggara, Indonesia
