= Sampi (disambiguation) =

Sampi is an archaic letter of the Greek alphabet.

Sampi may also refer to:

- Ashley Sampi (born 1984), Australian rules footballer
- Everlyn Sampi (born 1988), Australian actress

== See also ==
- Malean sampi, traditional cattle race conducted annually in Lombok, West Nusa Tenggara, Indonesia
- Sápmi, historic region of Arctic Scandinavia
