= Melly Mike (rapper) =

American rapper (born 1997)

- Born: Michael Hunter; January 6, 1997 (age 29); Minneapolis, Minnesota, U.S.
- Genres: Hip-hop; rage rap; trap music
- Occupations: Rapper; songwriter
- Instrument: Vocals
- Years active: 2019–present
- Labels: Epic; GAV Records
- Website: mellymikemafia.com

Michael Hunter (born January 6, 1997), known professionally as Melly Mike, is an American rapper from Minneapolis. He gained mainstream popularity with his 2024 single "Young Black & Rich", which went viral in 2025 after being used in videos of the Indonesian Pacu Jalur boat race, and debuting at number 50 on Billboard's Hot R&B/Hip-Hop Songs. Hunter signed with Epic Records in 2025.

== Life and career ==
=== Early life and military career ===
Hunter was born on January 6, 1997, in Minneapolis, Minnesota. He was raised in a small town in Minnesota by Liberian immigrant parents. He spent time at the library reading manga and listening to music.

After graduating from high school, Hunter enlisted in the United States Army. He served for six years and received the Soldier of the Year award twice. He left the military after turning down a promotion to sergeant to pursue a career in music.

=== Music career ===
Hunter began releasing music under the name Melly Mike during the 2020s. In 2024, he released the EP Selfish Nightmares, which included the single "Young Black & Rich". Other releases from the year included "Wolverine" and "Rent Free".

In 2025, "Young Black & Rich" gained popularity on TikTok after videos of Indonesian boat racer Rayyan Arkan Dikha dancing to the song during the Pacu Jalur race went viral. The videos helped start the "aura farming" trend, which spread across social media. The song's streams increased following the trend, reaching more than 2.7 million official on-demand streams in the United States during the week of July 12–18, 2025. "Young Black & Rich" became Hunter's first song to chart, debuting at number 50 on Billboard's Hot R&B/Hip-Hop Songs.

Hunter visited Indonesia in August 2025 to attend the Pacu Jalur festival, where his song had gained popularity. He later signed with Epic Records. Hunter released the EPs Selfish Nightmares and Selfish Nightmares 2.

In 2026, Hunter released the singles "The Same" and "God's Time". The latter was dedicated to his friend Jorge Munoz-Pederson, who was killed in a mass shooting in Austin, Texas. In September, he released "All I Need". On October 30, he released his eight-track EP TIME4WAR through Epic Records. The EP includes "Cut Throat", "Pride B4 The Fall", "All I Need", "Ain't Sweet", "Turnin Your Back", "Young Black & Rich", "F**ked Up", and "I'm So Glad".

== Artistry ==
Hunter's music has been described as rage rap, with elements of rock. His musical influences include Childish Gambino, Michael Jackson, and Linkin Park.

== Discography ==
=== EPs ===
- Selfish Nightmares (2024)
- Selfish Nightmares 2 (2025)
- TIME4WAR (2026)

=== Singles ===
- "Young Black & Rich" (2024)
- "Wolverine" (2024)
- "Rent Free" (2024)
- "The Same" (2026)
- "God's Time" (2026)
- "All I Need" (2026)
