= Serak Gulo =

Festival in Indonesia

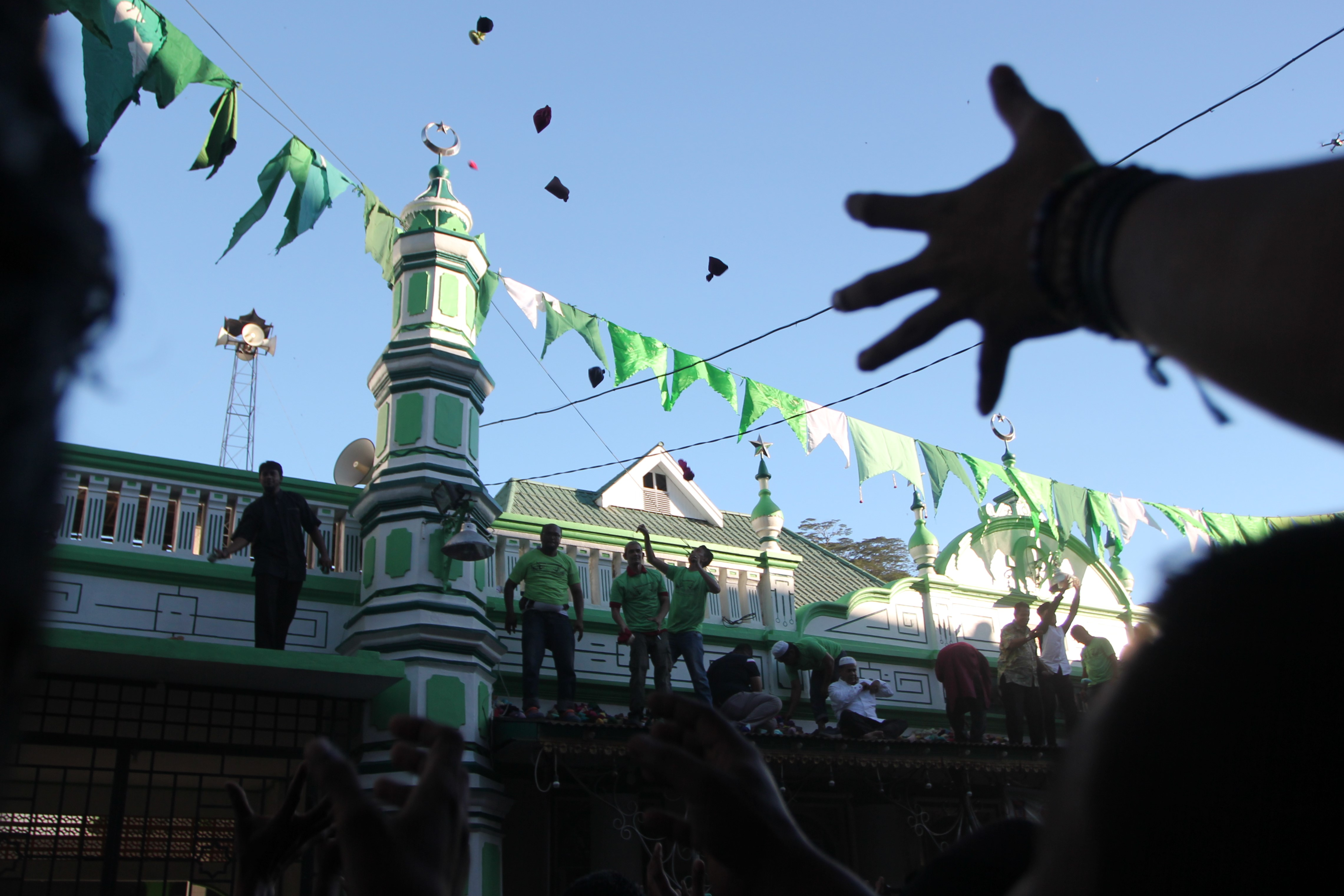
Serak Gulo festival in Padang.

Serak Gulo (Jawi: سراق ڬولو) is an annual festival celebrated by ethnic Indian Indonesian to express gratitude in Padang, West Sumatra, Indonesia. This tradition is held by distributing sugar to the public by menyerak (scattering or throwing) to it. Serak Gulo is commemorates every 1st Jumada al-Thani—in Islamic calendar.

== See also ==
- List of festivals in Indonesia
- Indian Indonesians
