= Young Black & Rich =

2024 single by Melly Mike

Single by Melly Mike

from the EP Selfish Nightmares
- Released: June 1, 2024
- Genre: Hip-hop; rage
- Length: 2:35
- Label: Self-released
- Songwriter: Michael Hunter
- Producer: Rollie

Melly Mike singles chronology
| "Gods Time" (2024) | "Young Black & Rich" (2024) | "Wolverine" (2024) |

Music video
- "Young Black & Rich" on YouTube

"Young Black & Rich" is a song by American rapper Melly Mike, released on June 1, 2024, as the lead single from his EP Selfish Nightmares (2025). It became a sleeper hit in mid-2025, as well as his breakout song after gaining traction on the video-sharing platform TikTok.

== Background ==
In an interview with Complex, Melly Mike described that at the time of creating the song, he was living through a difficult period and striving toward improvement. He said:

A fifteen-second sample of the viral song.

I was at the lowest point in my life and wanted it to change. I would wake up at 5 AM and run for miles, take cold showers, and listen to self-help audiobooks. It became my new lifestyle, and I wanted the music to reflect that. To make my song an affirmation.

== TikTok virality ==
In January 2025, a video of 11-year-old boy Rayyan Arkan Dhika dancing on the bow of a boat at the Indonesian Pacu Jalur was posted on TikTok. It slowly gained attention for months and went viral when users began pairing it with the song in the background. This created the concept of "aura farming", a Gen Alpha term referring to repetitively doing an action to appear cool or aligned with a specific aesthetic. People began recreating Dhika's dance to "Young Black & Rich" in TikTok clips, including the Paris Saint-Germain FC and AC Milan football clubs, some Formula One team and drivers, Marc Márquez, Travis Kelce, KSI and IShowSpeed. The song is also featured in the popular video game Steal a Brainrot.

== Commercial performance ==
According to Luminate, the song earned over 200,000 official on-demand streams in the United States during the week of June 20–26. It increased to over 920,000 streams in the following week (June 27-July 4), which was contributed by the song's success on TikTok. By the week of July 12–18, it had amassed over 2.73 million official on-demand U.S. streams as the "aura farming" trend increased in popularity. "Young Black & Rich" became Melly Mike's first song to chart, debuting at number 50 on Billboard's Hot R&B/Hip-Hop Songs.

== Charts ==
Chart performance for "Young Black & Rich"
| Chart (2025) | Peak position |
|---|---|
| US Hot R&B/Hip-Hop Songs (Billboard) | 50 |
