= ARTJOG =

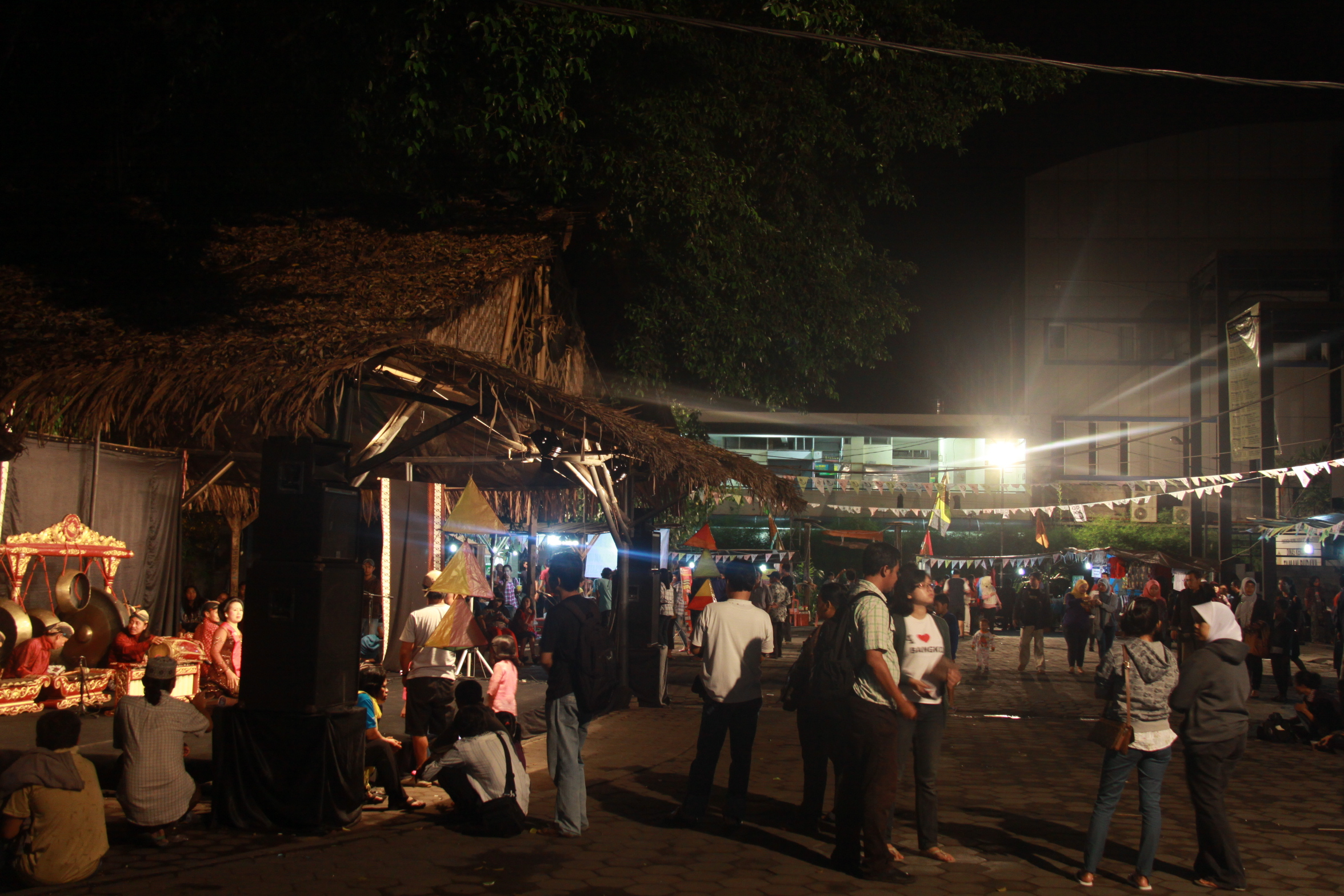
- Genre: Arts festival
- Frequency: Annually
- Locations: Yogyakarta, Indonesia
- Country: Indonesia
- Inaugurated: 2008
- Next event: July 23-Aug. 30, 2020
- Website: https://artjog.co.id/

ARTJOG is a contemporary art fair, held annually in Taman Budaya Yogyakarta, Indonesia. The fair started out in 2008 as part of the Yogyakarta Art Festival. The Jogja Art Fair became independent in 2009, and changed its name to Art Jog in 2010. In 2019 ARTJOG rebranded as an art festival from an art fair.

In 2019 ARTJOG MMXIX showcased 122 art works by 39 artists from home and abroad.
