= Pacu jawi =

Traditional bull race in West Sumatra, Indonesia

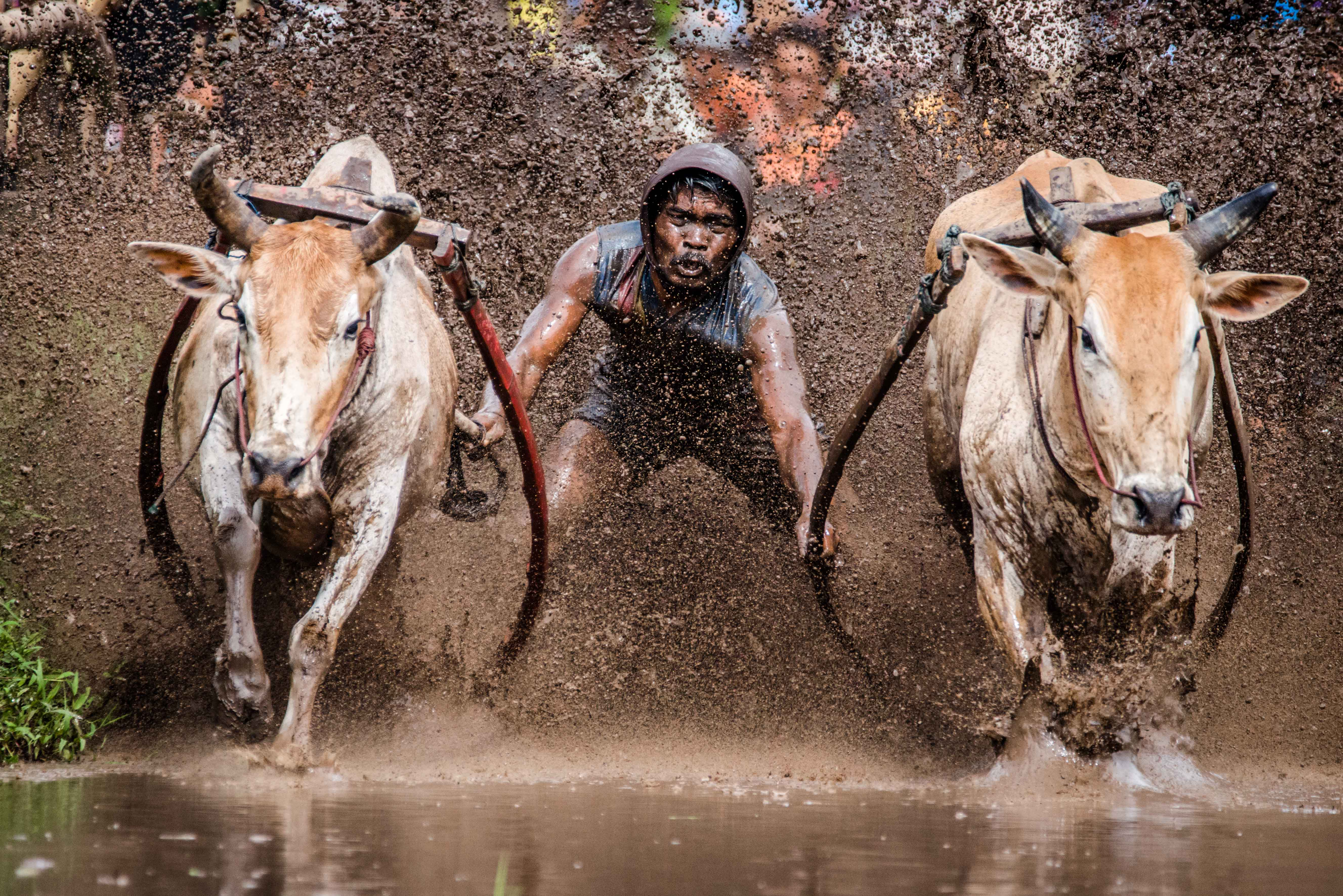
Two bulls running while the jockey holds on to them in pacu jawi, 2015.

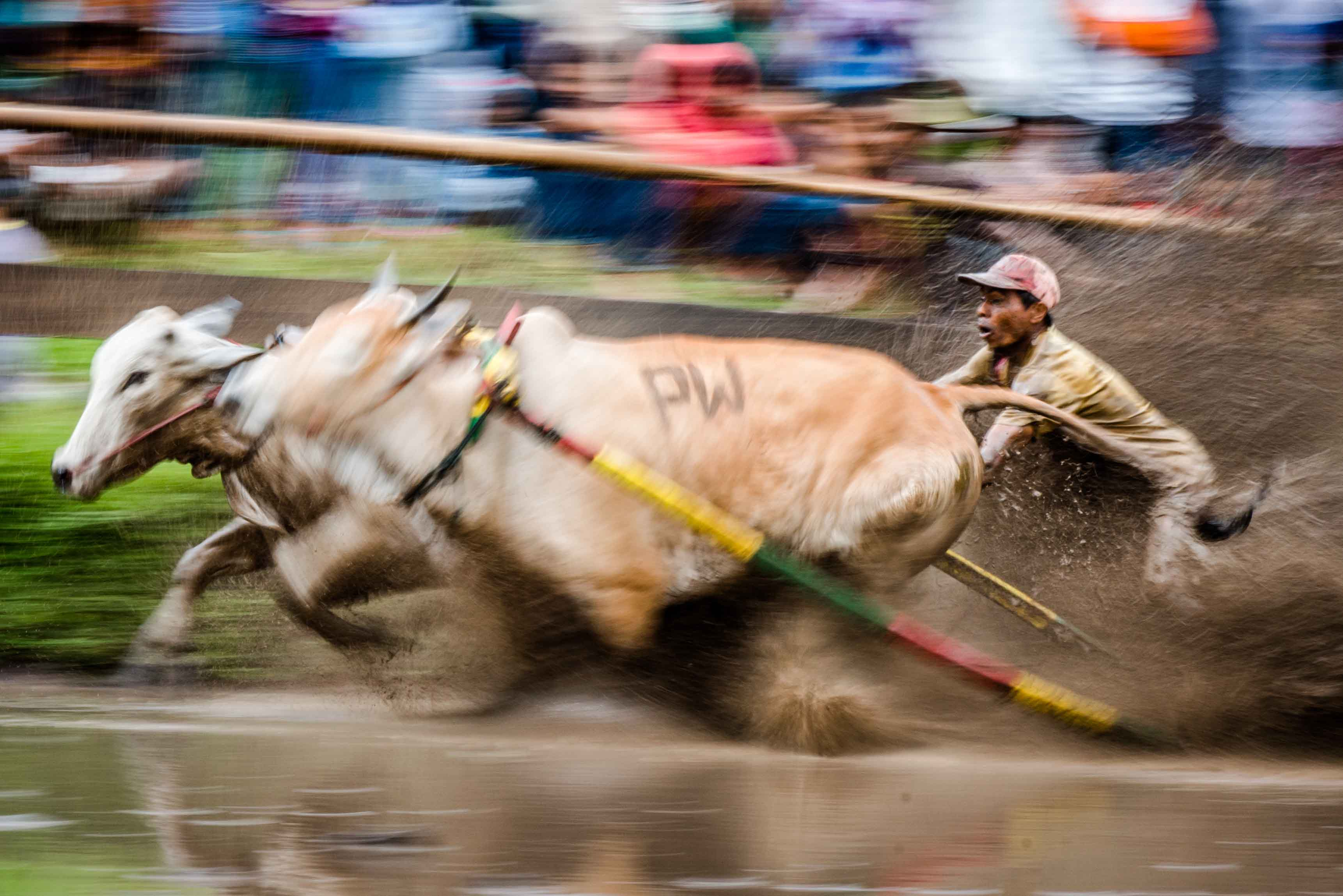
The side view of the bulls and jockey.

The pacu jawi (Minangkabau pronunciation: [ˈpatʃu ˈdʒawi]) is a traditional bull race in Tanah Datar, West Sumatra, Indonesia. In the race, a jockey stands on a wooden plough loosely tied to a pair of bulls and holds them by their tails while the bulls cover about 60–250 metres (200–820 ft) of muddy track in a rice field. Although the name means a "bull race", the bulls do not directly compete against each other, and no formal winner is declared. Instead, spectators judge the bulls by their performance (mostly their speed and their ability to run straight), and have the ability to buy well-performing bulls, albeit at well above usual price. The people of Tanah Datar—especially the nagaris (villages) in four of its districts—have been conducting this tradition for centuries to celebrate the end of the rice harvest. The race is held concurrently with a village festival of culture called alek pacu jawi. Recently it has become a tourist attraction supported by the government and the subject of multiple award-winning photographs.

== Background ==
Pacu jawi takes place in Tanah Datar, West Sumatra, Indonesia. Left: Tanah Datar in West Sumatra. Right: West Sumatra in Indonesia.

The pacu jawi is performed in Tanah Datar, one of the regencies of West Sumatra, Indonesia. According to tradition, the race can only be held where the 2,891 m-tall Mount Marapi—reputed to be the origin of the Minangkabau people who populate West Sumatra—is visible. It is held by the region's agrarian population, when the rice fields are empty after harvest and before the next planting. Its location is rotated between several nagaris of Tanah Datar. Traditionally, the hosts are the nagaris in four of Tanah Datar's districts: Sungai Tarab, Pariangan, Lima Kaum and Rambatan. Together, these four districts consist of 26 nagaris (as of 2014) with altitudes ranging between 550–700 metres (1,800–2,300 ft), and have 96.16 square kilometres (37.13 sq mi) rice fields and more than 12,000 cattle (2012 data). The race originated as post-harvest entertainment and a celebration for the villagers and has been taking place for centuries, predating the Indonesian independence. In the past, the event was held only twice a year, but the shortening of rice harvest cycle has allowed more frequent installments of pacu jawi. By 2013, one of the nagaris hosted it every two months, with each instance consisting of four events on Wednesdays or Saturdays.

== Race ==
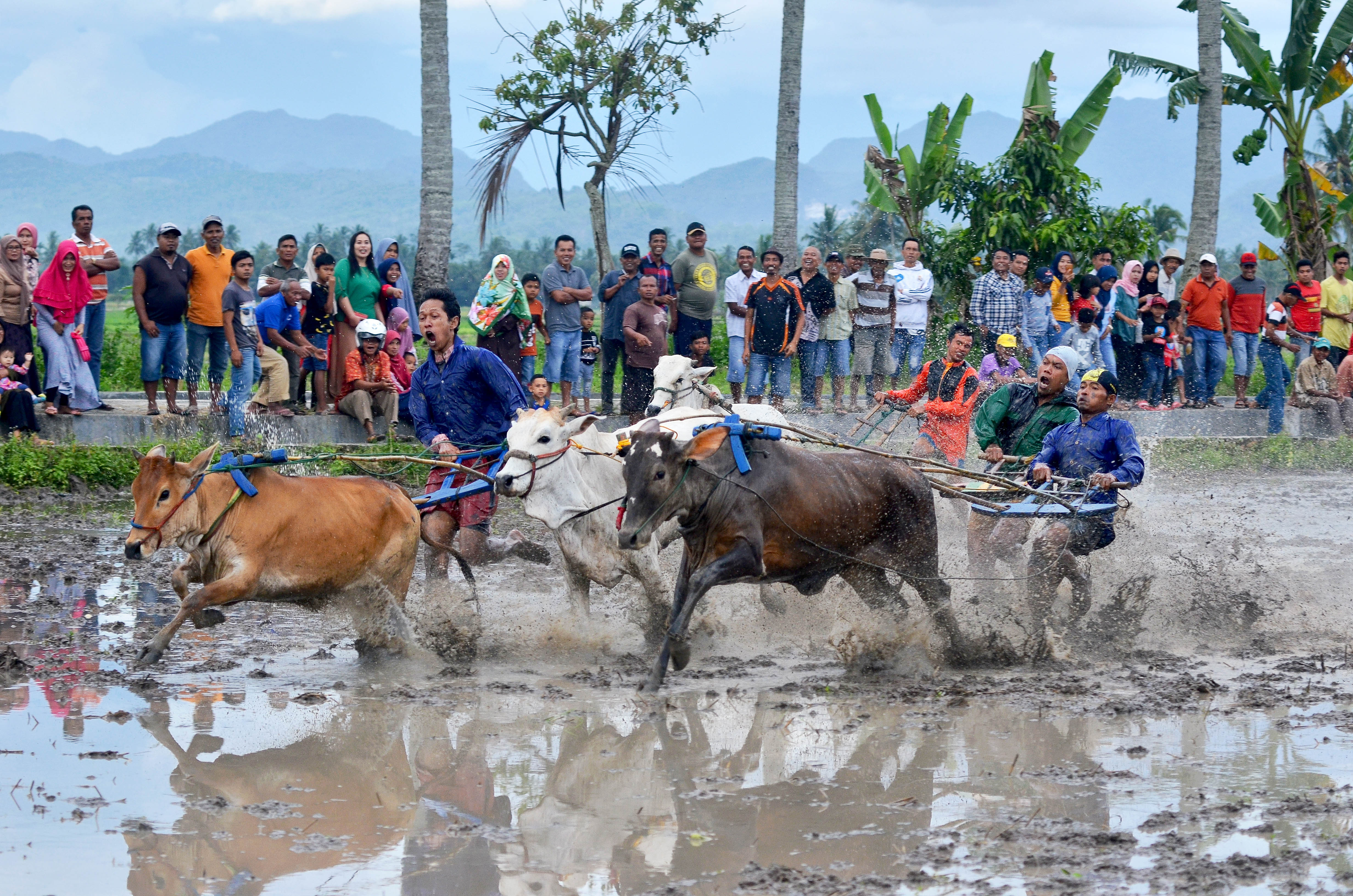
Bulls sprinting across the track while spectators look.

Despite its name pacu jawi (literally "bull race" or "cow race" in Minangkabau), it is not generally conducted as a direct competition between the animals. Instead, each participant (a jockey, with a pair of bulls) takes a turn running across the track. The animals are usually bulls (male cattle) between 2–13 years old, and run in pairs. Both bulls are connected by a rope to a wooden plough, where the jockey stands. They run in a muddy track, an empty patch of rice fields that have been cleared after harvest. Sources—witnessing different instances of the race—describe various length of the track, including around 60 metres (200 ft), 100 metres (330 ft), and 250 metres (820 ft). The track can be covered by up to 30 centimetres (12 in) of mud. The bulls are trained to start running when the plough is on the ground and someone steps on it. The jockey controls the animals and remains standing by holding on to the tails of both bulls. The jockey does not carry any whip. Because the rope connecting the animals is loose, the animals are likely to try to run in different directions or with different speeds, and the jockey must keep them running straight together while also struggling to stay upright.

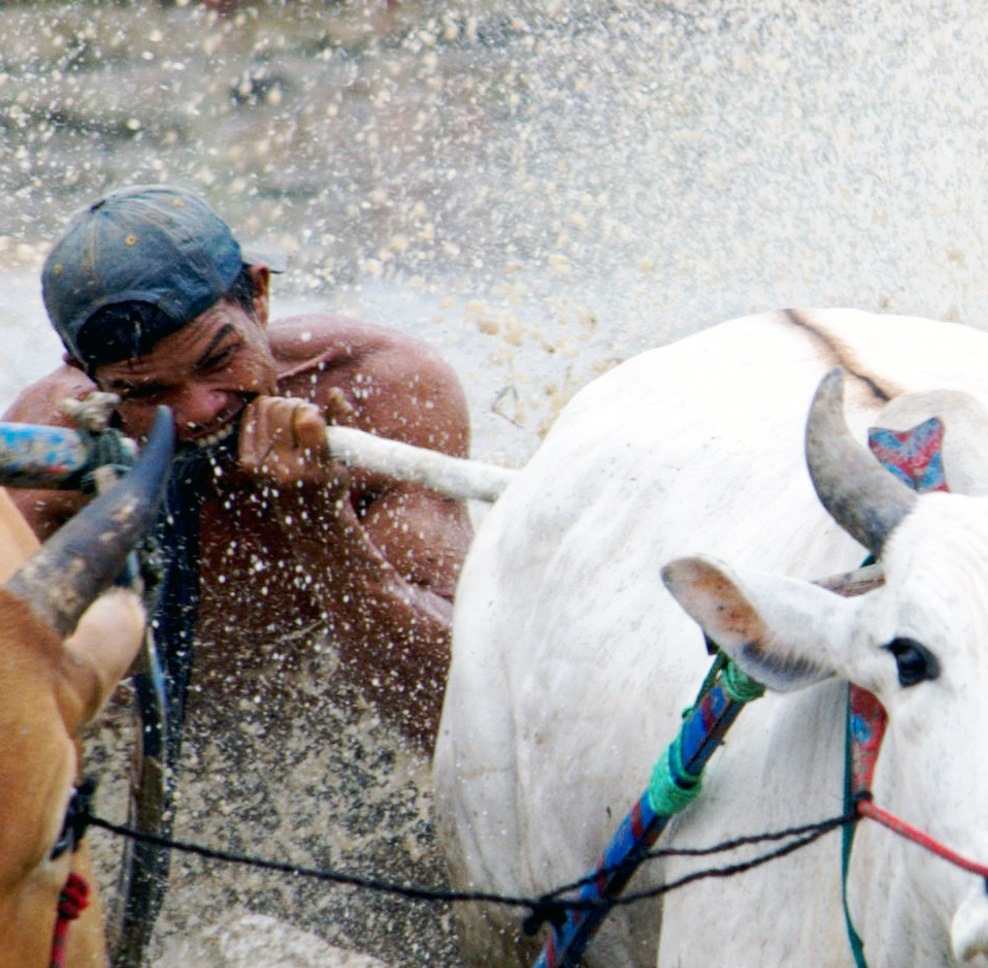
A jockey bites one of his bulls' tail as a signal to run faster.

Spectators, including international tourists, watch the race, usually from a dry patch of field higher than the track. Part of the attraction is the bulls' unexpected behavior, often causing the jockey to fall or to perform manoeuvres like biting a bull's tail to make it run faster. Occasionally the jockey does this to speed up his animals, especially when one is running slower than the other. Mud splashes everywhere, including on nearby spectators. Bulls might also veer off track and charge in the spectators' direction. Injuries, especially among jockeys, are quite common. No winner is declared, but spectators judge the bulls by their speed, strength, and their ability to run straight on the track. Traditionally, the ability to run straight is important, and it is meant to teach people that those who follow the straight path deserve the most respect and honor. Owning a well-performing pair of bulls can be a source of pride for the locals, so spectators might buy such bulls at up to 2–3 times their usual price. This potential profit is one of the main motivations among participants.

Hundreds of cattle can participate in a pacu jawi, including from the host nagari and also from the other three traditional nagaris of pacu jawi. Tanah Datar's Tourism Office provides funding and trucks for transporting the animals. Prior to this government involvement, cattle used to travel up to 50 kilometres (31 mi) on foot (often overnight). During the event, the cattle that are not currently racing are kept in a separate area, often near the finish line. Their presence is said to encourage the racing bulls to run faster to join the herd.

== Festival ==
The race is held concurrently with a village festival (Minangkabau: alek nagari) called the alek pacu jawi ("bull race festival"). Over the years, the festivities have included pageants of cattle dressed with suntiangs (a Minangkabau traditional headdress), performance of traditional music such as gendang tasa and talempong pacik, tari piring, a fair, and traditional games such as the panjat pinang (greasy pole) and a kite competition. Prior to the government's involvement, all costs were borne together by the villagers, but now Tanah Datar's Tourism Office provides some funding.

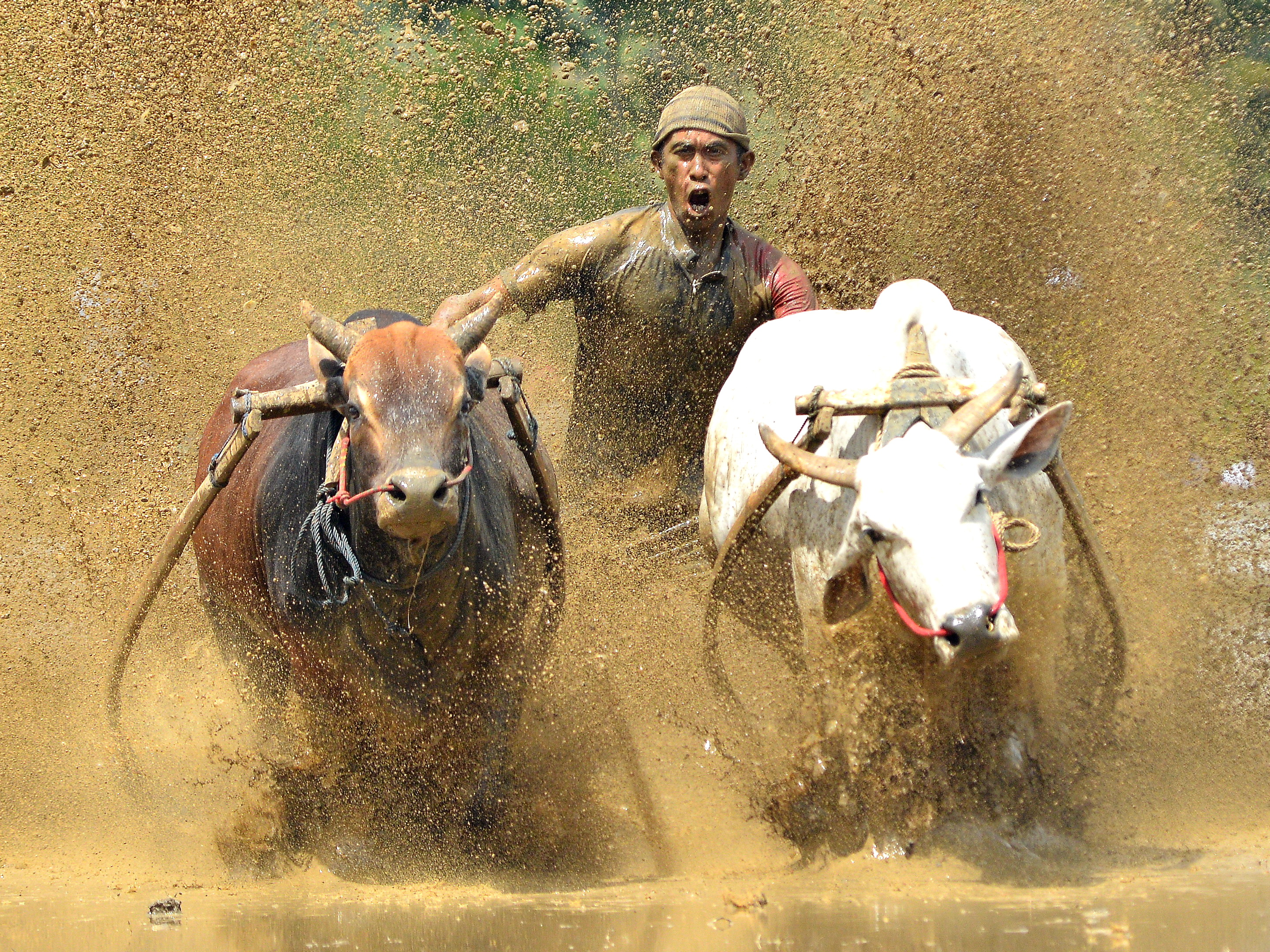
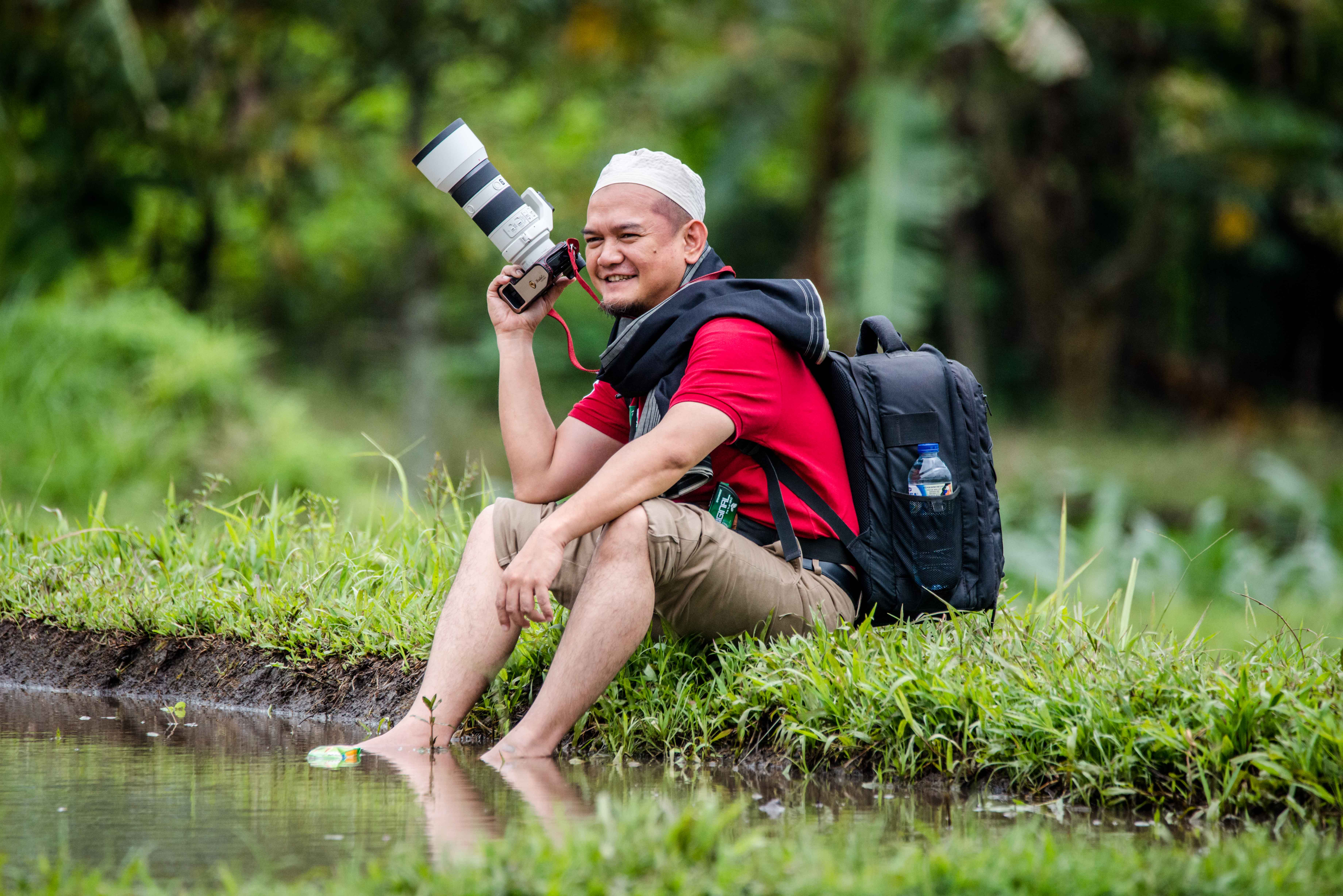
High-speed action, mud splashing and distinctive jockey expression (top) make pacu jawi an interesting subject of photography (bottom).

== Photography ==
Pacu jawi has attracted national and international photographers and has become subject of several award-winning photographs. Aesthetic factors associated with the event include its dramatic high-speed action, mud splashing, and the distinctive jockey facial expression and posture. Adding to the attraction, Tanah Datar is known for its natural views, including Mount Marapi, hills, green tropical vegetation, and rice fields. In order to take good photographs, photographers often have to be closer to the track than the general spectator area, and they risk getting soaked by mud and must be careful about charging bulls. Awards won by photographs of pacu jawi include the World Press Photo of the Year, Hamdan International Photography Award, The Daily Telegraph's Digital Camera Photographer of the Year and Wikimedia Commons Picture of the Year.

== See also ==
- Flying duck race (pacu itiak) in Payakumbuh, another area in West Sumatra
- Karapan sapi, chariot-style bull racing from Madura, Indonesia
- Kambala, a similar type of race held in the southwestern Indian state of Karnataka.
- Jallikattu, a traditional event in the Indian state of Tamil Nadu, India as a part of Pongal (festival) celebrations on Mattu Pongal.
