= Indonesia Menari =

Annual festival of traditional Indonesian dance

Indonesia Menari or Indonesia Dance is a collective dance movement or festival that is held every year in the month of November. It is arranged by Galeri Indonesia Kaya of Bakti Budaya Djarum Foundation. It was first held in 2012. The dance festival held simultaneously at many locations in Indonesia. It aims to introduce people to traditional Indonesian dances, to encourage more people, especially those of the young generation to learn traditional dances of Indonesia and to be proud of Indonesian culture.

Usually performed in the form of mass dance with choreography that combines several traditional and modern dance. The event is also enlivened by the presence of art workers who also danced together in the festivity of the event in each venue.

== See also ==
- Dance in Indonesia
- List of festivals in Indonesia
