= Nihon no Matsuri =

Japanese cultural festival in Indonesia

Nihon No Matsuri
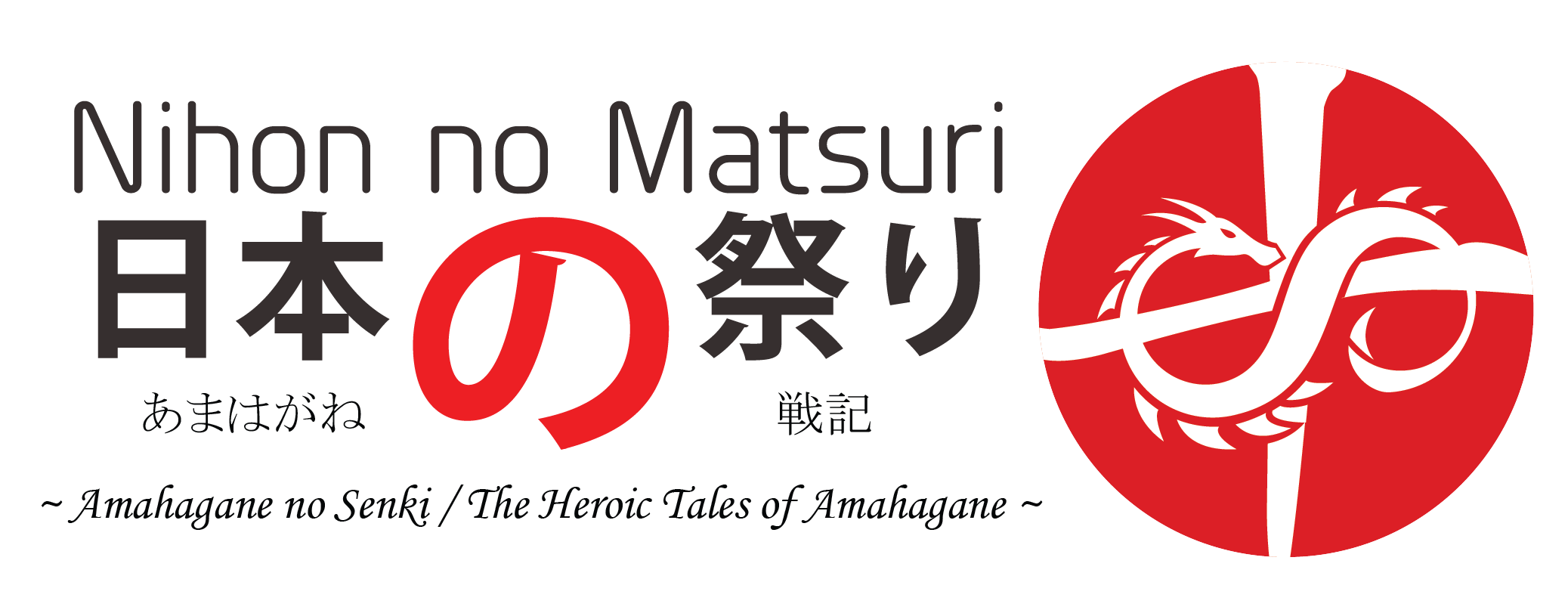
- Nihon no Matsuri 10; Amahagane no Senki (The Heroic Tales of Amahagane)
- Status: Active
- Venue: Telkom University
- Locations: Bandung, West Java
- Country: Indonesia
- Inaugurated: 2007
- Attendance: Around 5000, in 2013
- Organizer: Nihon no Matsuri Event Organizer
- Filing status: Non-Profit
- Website: http://www.nihonnomatsuri.org/

Nihon no Matsuri (日本の祭り, Nihon no Matsuri) (Japanese Festival) is a Japanese cultural festival held in Bandung, West Java, Indonesia. This is a big Japanese event organized by Telkom Institute of Technology’s. Nihon no Matsuri has been held every year since 2007. It contains different activities every year, but the main activities are the Band Auditions, the Cosplay Contest, the Culture and Self-Defense Show, Charity events, and Japanese Language training for high school students. Nihon no Matsuri has become one of the most awaited event for all japan-lovers in Bandung.

== Events List ==
| Series | Year | Themes | Location | Director | Date |
|---|---|---|---|---|---|
| Nihon no Matsuri I | 2007 | Festival Pop-Culture | Cihampelas Walk Bandung, West Java | M. Amrul Ummami | Closing 2 Desember 2007 |
| Nihon no Matsuri II | 2008 | Let's Feel the Greatest Japanese Event | Cihampelas Walk Bandung, West Java | Septian Dwijayanto | - |
| Nihon no Matsuri III | 2009 | Let Evolution Begin with Culture and Technology | Cihampelas Walk Bandung, West Java | Agung Dermawan | - |
| Nihon no Matsuri IV | 2010 | Minna no Densetsu (みんな の 伝説, Minna no Densetsu); Legend of Everyone | Cihampelas Walk Bandung, West Java | Agung Radistya Putra | - |
| Nihon no Matsuri V | 2011 | Fuyu no Nioi (冬 の 匂い, Fuyu no Nioi); Scent of Winter | IT Telkom Bandung | Raden Ismoyojati | |
| Nihon no Matsuri VI | 2013 | Yume No Kuni (夢の国, Yume no Kuni); The Land of Dreams | Telkom University Convention Hall | Dimas Satrio Hutomo | Opening 11 Maret 2013, Closing 4&5 Mei 2013 |
| Nihon no Matsuri VII | 2014 | Atarashii Monogatari (新しい 物語, Atarashii Monogatari); The New Story | Telkom University Convention Hall | Abrori NoorEsa | Opening 21 Maret 2014 Closing 9 & 11 Mei 2014 |
| Nihon no Matsuri VIII | 2015 | Eien no Tabi (新しい 物語, Eien no Tabi); Infinity Journey | Telkom University Convention Hall | Rijal Permana | Opening "Creativenture" 6 Maret 2015 Closing 2 & 3 Mei 2015 |
| Nihon no Matsuri IX | 2016 | Shiawase no Iro (幸せの色, Shiawase no Iro); Colour of Happiness | Telkom Convention Center | Rizky Anandra | Opening "DigiBoard", 11 Maret 2016 Closing "Festival" 29–30 April 2016 |
| Nihon no Matsuri X | 2017 | Amahagane no Senki (あまはがねの戦記, Amahagane no Senki)The Heroic Tales of Amahagane | Telkom University Convention Hall | Bram Manuel Banuarta Sianturi | 29 & 30 April 2017 |
| Nihon no Matsuri XI | 2018 | Ai to Kibou no Gekijou (愛と希望の劇場, Ai to Kibou no Gekijou) Theater of Love and Hope | Telkom University Convention Hall | Mokhamad Ilham Fadhillah | 21 & 22 April 2018 |
| Nihon no Matsuri XII | 2019 | Jinrui no kao (人類の顔, Jinrui no kao) The Face of Mankind | Telkom University Convention Hall | Sandy Fahmi Hermawan | 28 April 2019 |
| Nihon no Matsuri XIII | 2020 | Jikū no hōrō-sha (時空の放浪者, Jikū no hōrō-sha) The Time Space Wanderer | Landmark Convention Hall Braga | Daffa Ahmad Syahada | 4 & 5 April 2020 |
| Nihon no Matsuri XIV | 2023 | Fukkatsu no Saikai (復活の再会, Fukkatsu no Saikai) The Revival Reunion | Telkom University Convention Hall | Medillah Lita Saputri | 9 Juli 2023 |
| Nihon no Matsuri XV | 2024 | Kōun no senku-sha (幸運の先駆者, Kōun no senku-sha) Harbinger of Fortune | Telkom University Convention Hall | Ramdhani | 23 Juni 2024 |
| Nihon no Matsuri XVI | 2025 | Tsugi Wa, Hara-J Sutēshon(次は、ハラ-J ステーション, Tsugi Wa, Hara-J Sutēshon) Next Stop, Hara-J Station | Telkom University Convention Hall | Ichsan Rasyid Maulana | 21 Juni 2025 |
| Nihon no Matsuri XVII | 2026 | | | | |

== Gallery ==
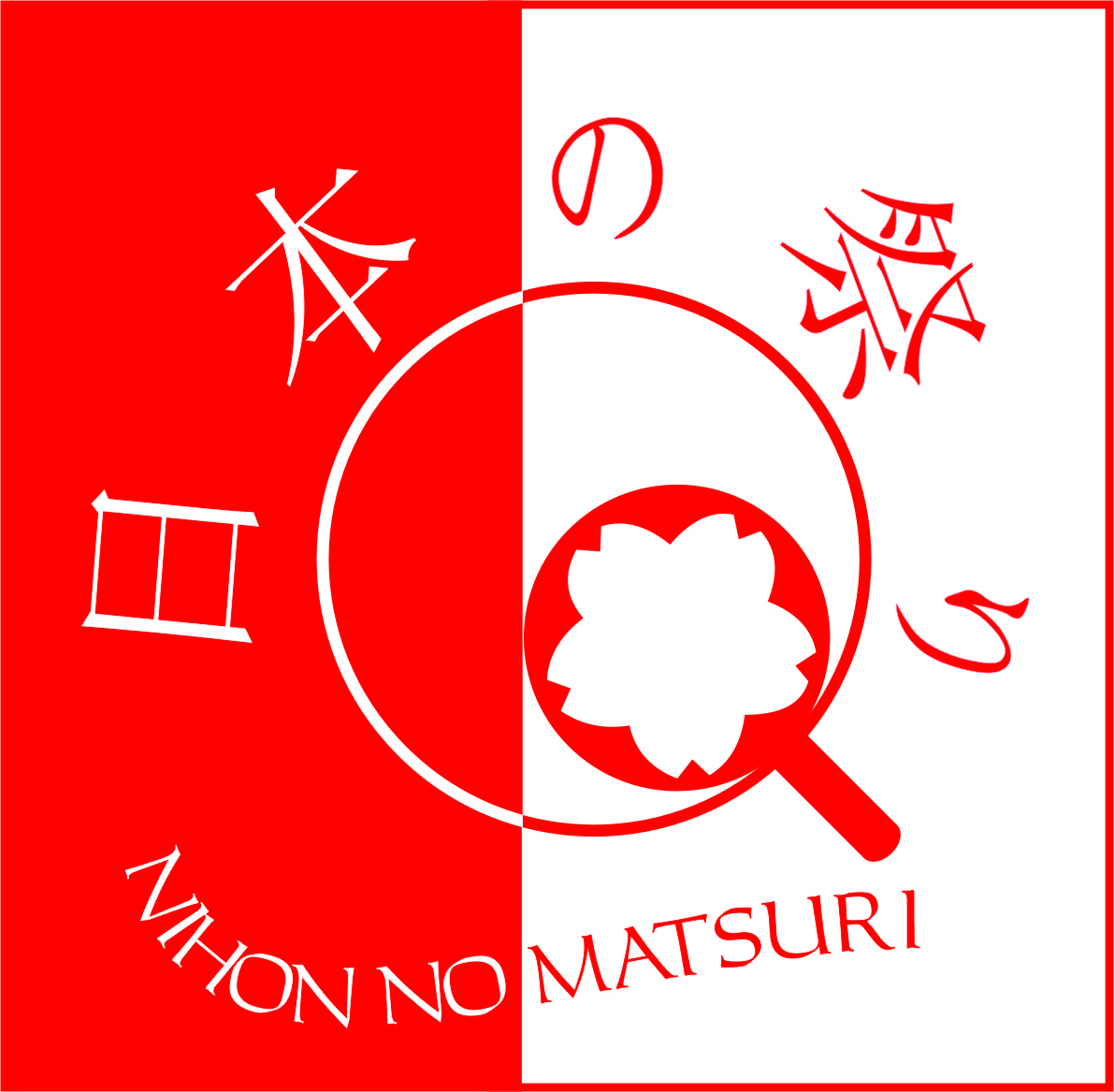
Logo Nihon no Matsuri I

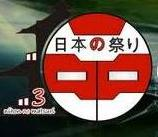
Logo Nihon no Matsuri III

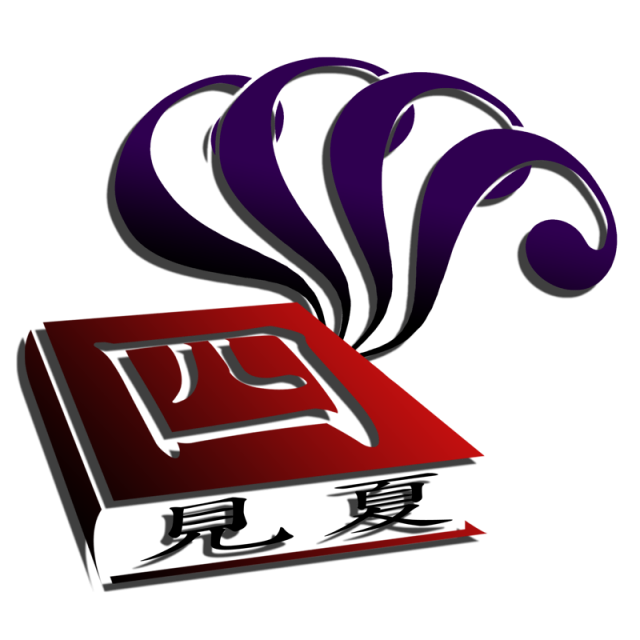
Logo Nihon no Matsuri IV

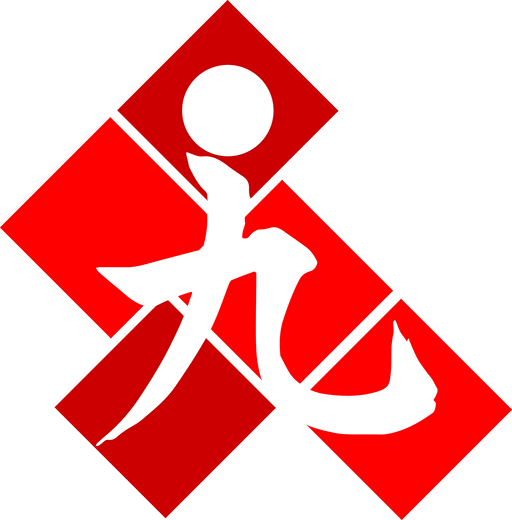
Logo Nihon no Matsuri IX
