= Buffalo racing in Kerala =

Spectator sport

A man controls his buffalos in the Kaalapoottu race held at Malappuram Kerala

Bull or Buffalo racing ("Kala or Pothu poottu matsaram") is an agricultural spectator sport held in Kerala, India for thousands of years.
