= Rabu pungkasan =

Rabu pungkasan (lit. 'last Wednesday') is a customary ceremony to expect a blessing which is held on the last Wednesday of Safar in the Jejeran Field, Wonokromo, Bantul Regency, Indonesia. The ceremony is performed on the last Wednesday of Safar because on that day, Kyai Usman Faqih (religious figures in Pleret) held a meeting with Sri Sultan Hamengku Buwono I.
