= Jakarnaval =

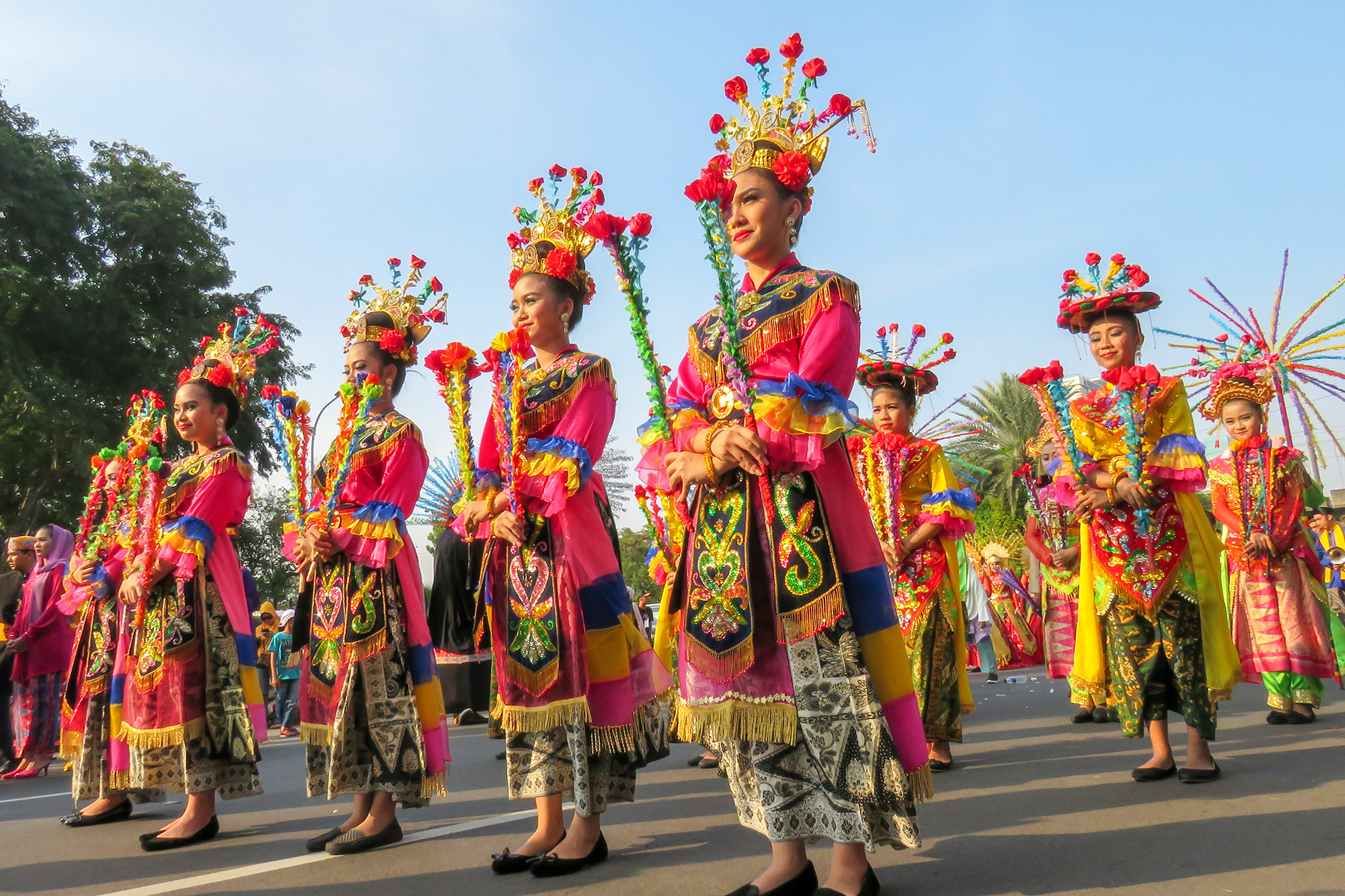
- Type: cultural
- Significance: Celebration of anniversary of Jakarta.
- Celebrations: Parades, parties, open-air performances
- Frequency: annual
- Related to: Carnival

Jakarnaval is an annual cultural parade organized by the DKI Jakarta Provincial Government as part of the founding of Jakarta's anniversary in Indonesia.Anniversary of Jakarta is celebrated by arranging various program throughout the month of June every year, such as Jakarta Fair, Jakarta Night Festival, Kota Tua Creative Festival etc.

Jakarnaval is a flagship activity of the celebration of the anniversary of Jakarta's founding, and is usually held at venues centered around Merdeka Square, Jakarta. Jakarnaval has been included in the Indonesian Ministry of Tourism's annual calendar of tourism events. The carnival usually displays an art parade followed by a float parade. The carnival parade displays different communities and cultures of Indonesia. Some foreign embassies based in Jakarta also participate the Jakarnaval parade to represent their respective countries' cultures.
