= Aura farming =

Slang term for developing charisma

Aura farming is a colloquialism denoting the act of cultivating an appearance of effortless charisma, i.e. "coolness", often through repetitive actions to that end. Popularized in 2024, the term soon became associated with a viral dance originated by Rayyan Arkan Dikha, a boy from Indonesia. The Funk Carioca and Phonk musical genres have made this type of viral internet challenge more representative and global.

== Origins ==
The expression "aura farming" was popularized in 2024, largely in reference to anime characters and various celebrities. It generally describes someone who does something repetitive to look "cool" and build "aura" – a slang term synonymous with charisma or "rizz", although the latter has romantic connotations that are not shared by "aura".

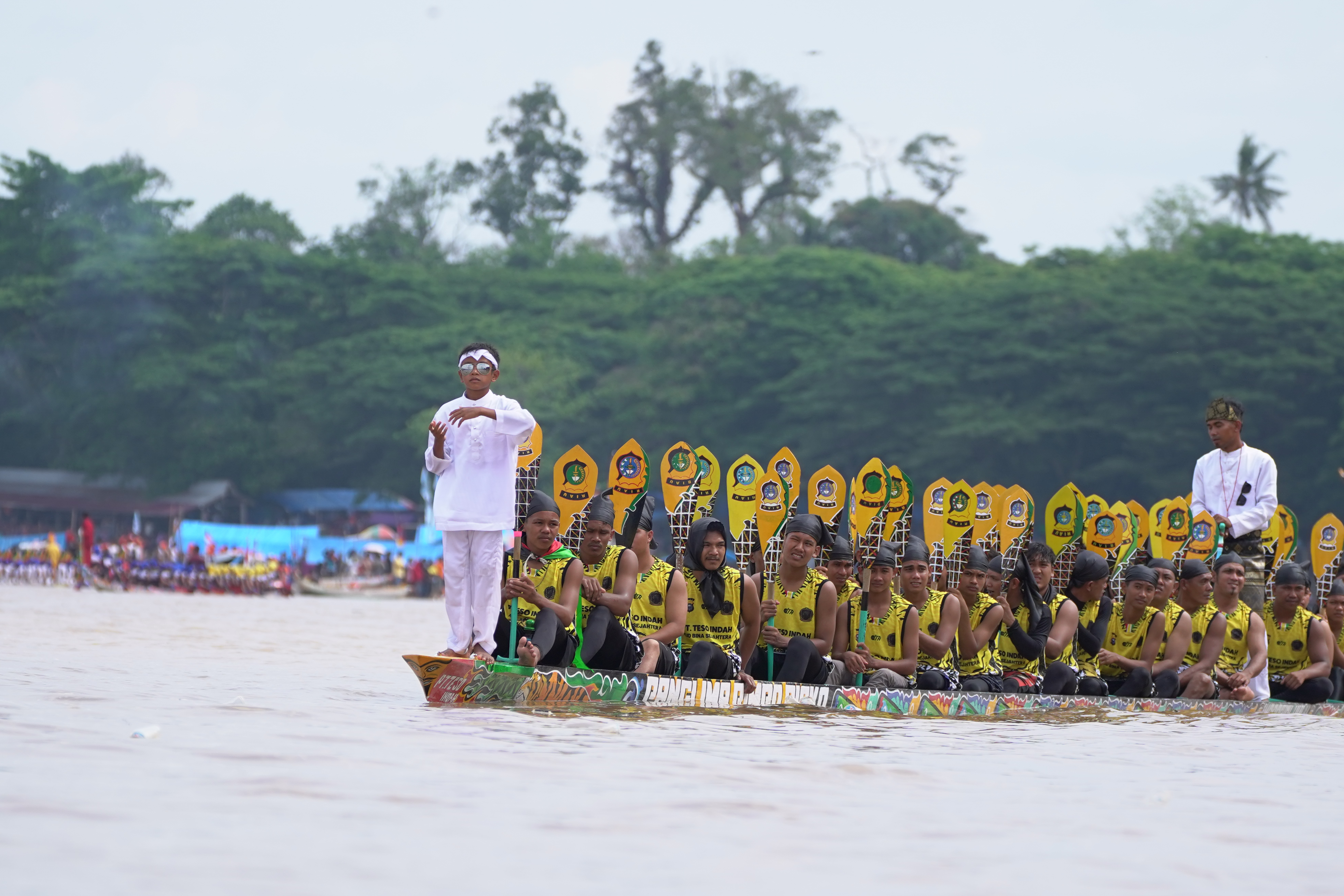
In a Pacu Jalur race, boats have a child at the front who performs a dance when the team is leading

A dance attached to the phrase was popularized by a viral video of an 11-year-old Indonesian boy, Rayyan Arkan Dikha, performing a rhythmic dance on the bow of a traditional racing boat during the Pacu Jalur festival in Riau, Indonesia. The Togak Luan (or Tukang Tari) is a child performer whose role is to hype the team and signal to spectators when the boat is leading. The role requires significant balance, which is why children are often chosen over adults.

In the video, Dikha, wearing a traditional Teluk Belanga outfit with a Malay Riau headcloth and sunglasses, performs a series of calm, repetitive dance moves to energize the rowers. In interviews, Dikha stated that he created the dance spontaneously.

The video was first posted on TikTok and went viral in mid-2025. Social media users began remixing the clip with various songs under hashtags such as "aura farming kid on boat," amassing millions of views. According to The New York Times, the trend made Dikha "hard to miss on social media" in mid-2025.

As a result of the video's popularity, Dikha was appointed as a cultural and tourism ambassador for Riau province by the local governor. He and his mother were invited to the capital, Jakarta, to meet with the country's Ministers of Culture and Tourism. He was also awarded a government scholarship.

=== Global imitations ===
The dance became a global meme, imitated by international sports teams and celebrities, which amplified its viral spread. Notable recreations included:

- American football player Travis Kelce, whose video garnered over 14 million views.
- The French football club Paris Saint-Germain (PSG).
- Formula One driver Alex Albon.
- Footballer Diego Luna, who used the dance as a goal celebration.
- YouTuber and entertainer KSI and music producer Steve Aoki.
- Arsenal Women and England women's national football team player Chloe Kelly during the Lionesses' Euro 2025 victory parade in Central London.

The Phonk and Funk Carioca musical genres have boosted the notoriety of the Internet challenge.

== Aura battles ==
Demonstration of Aura Battle in Venezuela.

In July 2026, competitive "aura battles" were held in several Latin American cities, and shared on social media. In each battle, two contestants face each other to perform gestures, poses, and dances, and they compete for reactions from the crowd.

== Clip farming ==
"Clip farming" refers to the practice of deliberately performing controversial, exaggerated or provocative actions in an effort to cultivate a sense of social engagement around a person.

The term originated online but has now spread to real-world contexts.

Clip farming is not synonymous with aura farming; the former is distinguished by its premeditated and overt nature, whereas the latter relies on the projection of effortless or incidental charisma regardless of setting.

== See also ==
- Serving cunt – Vulgar slang term
- Sprezzatura - Italian word that refers to a kind of effortless grace
