= Flying duck race =

Traditional animal race

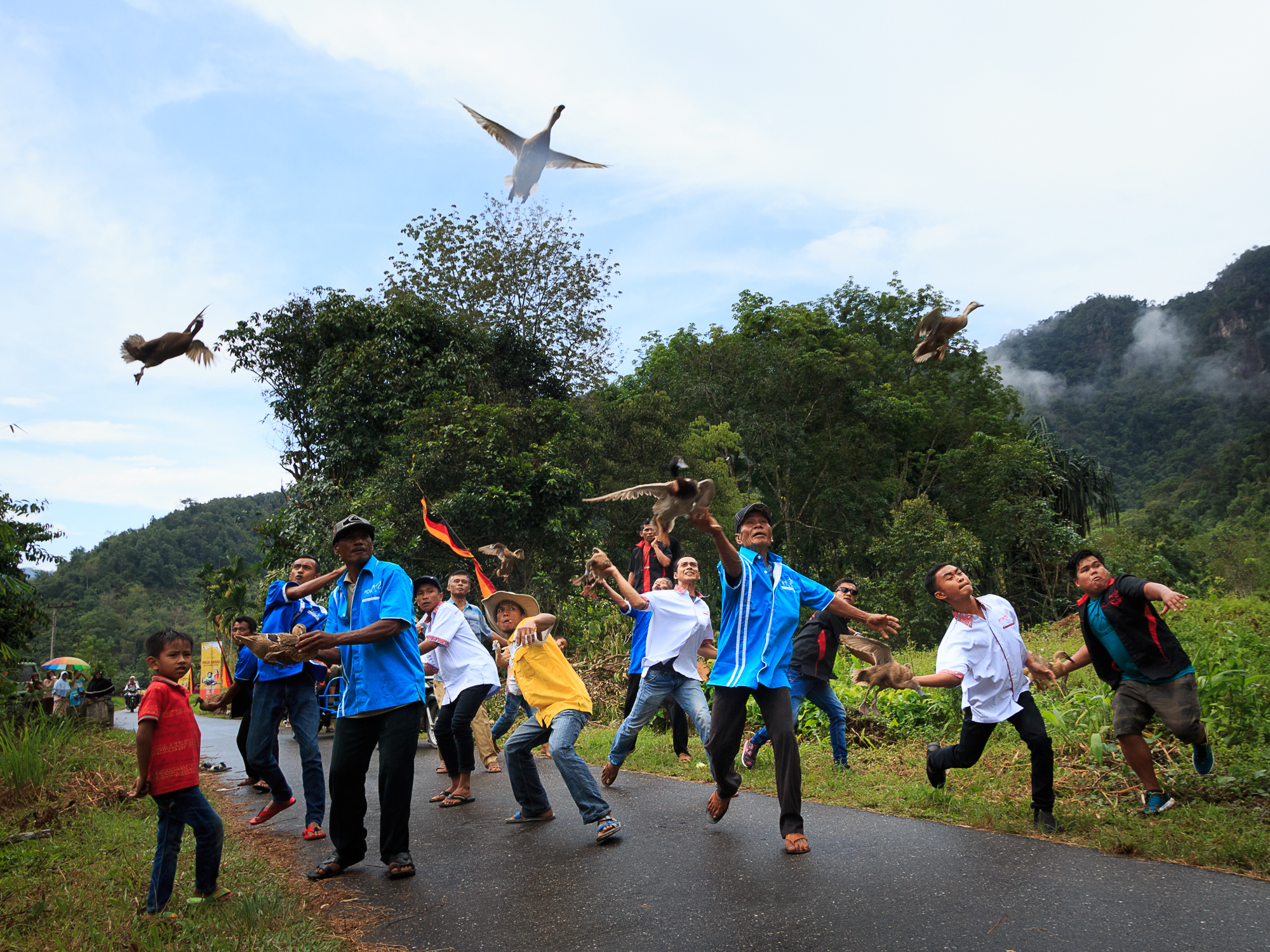
Pacu Itiak in Payakumbuh, 2017

A flying duck race (Indonesian: Pacu Itiak) is a tradition in Payakumbuh, West Sumatra where ducks fly towards a specified finish line.

Young female ducks (4–6 months old) that cannot fully fly are used, and ducks are numbered on their bills. Races cover distances ranging from 600 to 2,000 metres (2,000 to 6,600 ft). Races are held weekly in different areas, along streets or over rice fields. The races are accompanied with music and parade activities.
