= Malean sampi =

Indonesian cattle race

Male'an Sampi is a traditional cattle race conducted annually in Lombok, West Nusa Tenggara, Indonesia. The race is open to the public. It takes place during the festival held following the harvest. Translated from the Sasak language, Male'an Sampi literally means to run or chase after (male'an) a cow or cattle (sampi). The race is not run on traditional racing terrain but rather on a rice paddy, requiring the cattle to struggle for approximately 200 meters through several inches or more of water. The individual animals are decorated by their respective owners to identify them during the race and add to the festive atmosphere.
