= Taman Budaya Yogyakarta =

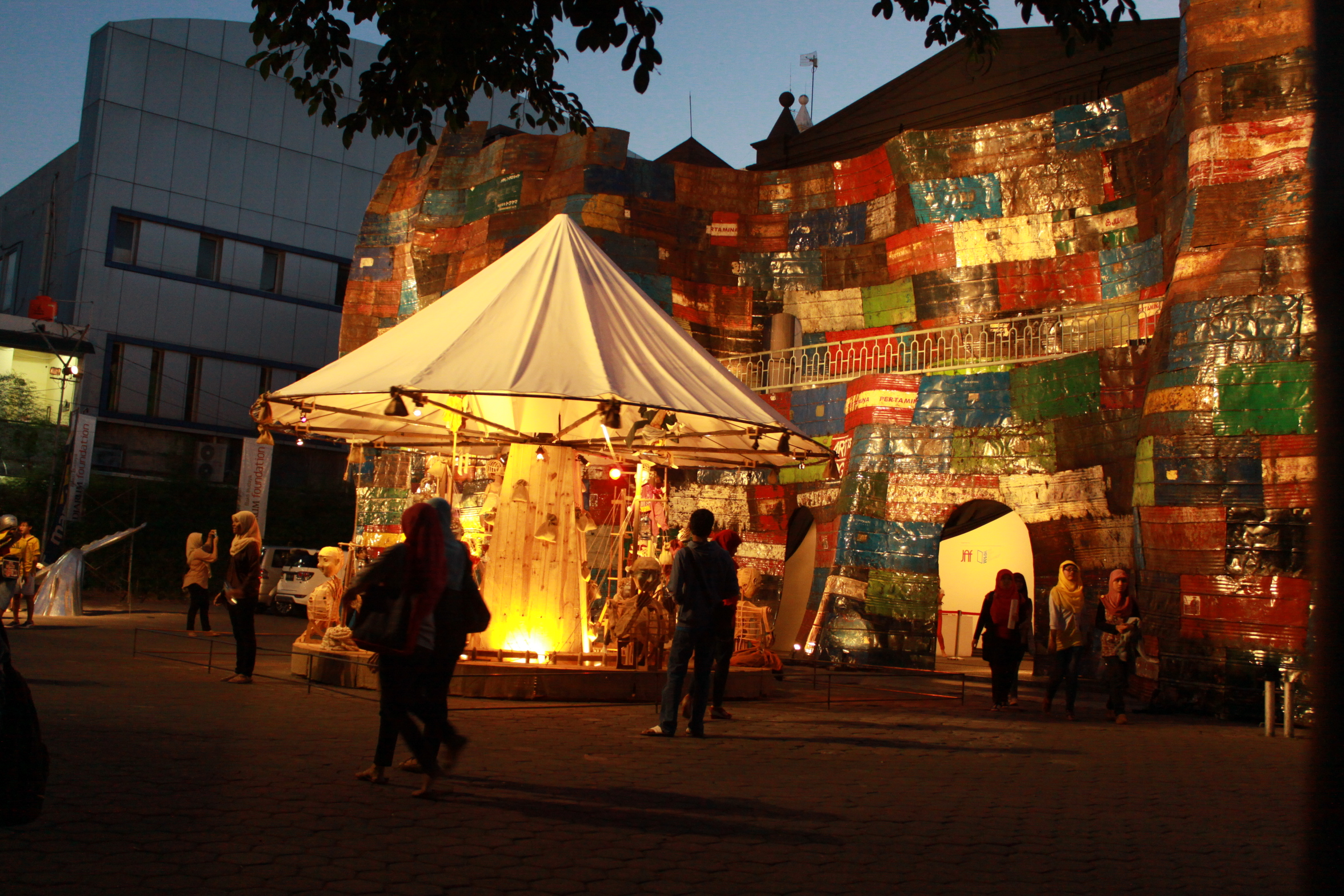
The ArtJog Fair 2013, held annually in Taman Budaya Yogyakarta, Indonesia

Taman Budaya Yogyakarta (Javanese: ꦠꦩꦤ꧀ꦧꦸꦣꦪꦔꦪꦺꦴꦒꦾꦏꦂꦠ, romanized: Taman Budhaya Ngayogyakarta, Cultural Park of Yogyakarta, popularly abbreviated as TBY) is a place of cultural development center in Yogyakarta, Indonesia. TBY complex consists of two buildings namely the Taman Budaya Concert Hall and Societet Militair Building. The Concert Hall main functions as official room for fine art exhibition, such as painting, visual art, sculpture, and craft.
