= GoPay =

- Type: Private
- Industry: Financial technology
- Predecessor: Go-Jek Credit
- Founded: 2016
- Area served: Indonesia
- Services: Digital wallet, payments, financial services
- Website: gopay.co.id

GoPay is an Indonesian digital payments and financial services platform and part of GoTo financial services division, GoTo Financial. It operates in Indonesia’s digital payments and financial technology sector. Originating within the Gojek ecosystem, GoPay developed from an internal payment system for ride-hailing and on-demand services into a broader digital financial services platform in Indonesia.

By 2025, GoPay's services included digital payments, lending, pay-later products, and access to banking and savings services.

GoPay has also been associated with efforts to expand access to financial services in Indonesia, where a significant portion of the population has historically been unbanked or underbanked.

== History ==
=== Origins and early development ===
GoPay was introduced in 2016 as the successor to Go-Jek Credit, a digital payment feature used within the Gojek platform. In its initial stage, it functioned primarily as a closed-loop payment system facilitating transactions between users and drivers for ride-hailing and other on-demand services.

To support its payments operations, Gojek acquired PonselPay in 2016, a licensed electronic money provider, enabling compliance with Indonesia’s financial regulations and supporting payment infrastructure development.

In 2017, Gojek expanded its payments business through the acquisition of Kartuku, Midtrans, and Mapan. The acquisitions added capabilities in areas including offline merchant payments, online payment processing, and financial services. Kartuku contributed merchant acquiring infrastructure for offline merchants, while Midtrans strengthened online payment processing capabilities.

At the time of the acquisitions, Gojek said its payment business served more than 125,000 merchants and processed more than 100 million transactions per month.

In July 2024, GoTo Financial launched GoPay Merchant, a dedicated app for merchants, particularly micro, small and medium-sized enterprises (MSMEs). The app provides features for QRIS registration, fund disbursement and fraud prevention. In October 2024, GoPay launched GoPay Games, a web-based platform that offers game top-ups and game vouchers.

=== Open-loop payments and QR adoption ===
Beginning in 2018, GoPay expanded beyond Gojek’s internal ecosystem into an open-loop payment system, allowing wider use across offline merchants and third-party services. This expanded GoPay's use beyond Gojek's internal services to offline merchants and third-party services.

The platform first expanded through QR-based merchant payments. The system was later standardized under Indonesia’s national QRIS framework, supporting interoperability between payment providers and merchants and allowing wider merchant acceptance across Indonesia’s digital payments ecosystem.

Within a year of wider QR adoption, GoPay reported transaction volume of approximately Rp89.5 trillion within the year following wider QR adoption.

During this period, competition among major platforms such as Gojek and Grab intensified as payments and financial services became an increasingly important part of competition between regional technology platforms across Southeast Asia.

=== Integration with financial services and banking ===
GoPay subsequently expanded its services to include consumer financial products such as pay-later services, lending, and savings access.

A key milestone was Gojek’s investment in Bank Jago, where it increased its stake to approximately 22%.

The partnership linked GoPay's digital wallet services with Bank Jago's banking infrastructure.

The collaboration later expanded through GoPay Tabungan by Jago, which allowed users to access savings accounts and banking services directly within the GoPay and Gojek applications, linking wallet-based payments with digital banking functions.

The ecosystem supporting Gojek and GoPay attracted investment from global technology and financial companies including Google, Facebook, PayPal, and Tencent, amid growing international interest in Southeast Asia’s digital economy.

=== Formation of GoTo ===
In 2021, Gojek merged with Tokopedia to form GoTo, creating one of Southeast Asia’s largest technology groups in a merger reportedly valued at approximately $18 billion. The merger combined ride-hailing, e-commerce, and financial services into a single ecosystem, and GoPay became part of GoTo Financial, expanding its role across ride-hailing, commerce, lending, and digital banking services within the GoTo ecosystem.

In 2023, GoPay was launched as a standalone application outside the main Gojek app, allowing users to access GoPay services independently of Gojek's transportation services. The standalone app was introduced to expand access beyond Gojek users and improve access to financial services, particularly for users outside the core GoTo ecosystem.

== Services and operations ==
GoPay’s services span payments, consumer finance, merchant enablement, and financial services integration within the GoTo ecosystem.

=== Payments infrastructure ===
GoPay supports digital transactions across online and offline merchants, including QR-based payments using Indonesia’s national QRIS standard. This followed its earlier transition from internal platform payments to open-loop merchant payments across a wider retail network.

At the time of the 2017 acquisitions, Gojek's payment business processed more than 100 million transactions per month.

=== Financial services expansion ===
GoPay expanded beyond payments into consumer financial services including lending, pay-later services, savings access, and digital banking integration. Reuters reported that Bank Jago, in which Gojek held a stake through its fintech arm GoPay, planned to allow users to open and manage bank accounts directly from the Gojek app, while also expanding access to lending through partnerships with peer-to-peer lenders and savings via investment fintechs.

Its lending services included products such as GoPay Later and GoPay Pinjam, with GoTo reporting that the consumer loans' outstanding principal from these lending products reached approximately Rp7.6 trillion in 2025.

GoPay also expanded into digital investment services through collaboration with investment platform Pluang and later into insurance-related products.

=== Ecosystem integration ===
GoPay provides payment services across the GoTo ecosystem, including mobility, food delivery, and e-commerce services such as Tokopedia.

GoTo also used loyalty and rewards mechanisms, including points-based programs, across its services.

GoPay's integration of payments and financial services was part of a broader trend among Southeast Asian super apps, which commonly combined multiple transactional functions, including payments and financial services.

=== Merchant services ===
GoPay’s development has also been supported by investments in merchant infrastructure. In 2020, Gojek acquired point-of-sale platform Moka for approximately $130 million, to expand its payment ecosystem for small and medium-sized businesses. The acquisition combined Moka's point-of-sale services with Gojek's payment and other merchant services.

== Market position ==
GoPay operates in Indonesia and competes with other payment services associated with ride-hailing and e-commerce platforms, including Grab, OVO, DANA, and ShopeePay.

A 2020 survey reported GoPay as the most-used mobile wallet among respondents in Indonesia.

== Industry landscape ==
According to the e-Conomy Southeast Asia 2024 report by Google, Temasek, and Bain & Company, Southeast Asia's digital economy generated more than $260 billion in gross merchandise value in 2024, with Indonesia accounting for approximately $90 billion.

== See also ==
- Gojek
- Tokopedia
