= BINUS University =

Private university in Indonesia

Coordinates: 6.2019°S 106.7818°E

BINUS UNIVERSITY
- Universitas Bina Nusantara
- Former name: Akademi Teknik Komputer (ATK)
- Motto: A world-class university, fostering and empowering society in building and serving the nation.
- Type: Private university
- Established: August 8, 1996
- Founders: Joseph Wibowo Hadipoespito; Theresia Widia Soerjaningsih
- Accreditation: AACSB; TEDQUAL; ABET; IABEE
- Rector: Dr. Nelly, S, Kom., M.M., CSCA
- Location: Jakarta, Indonesia
- Campus: West Jakarta, South Jakarta, Bekasi, Alam Sutera, Bandung, Malang, Semarang
- Colors: Maroon
- Website: www.binus.ac.id

Bina Nusantara University, also known as BINUS UNIVERSITY, is a private university in Indonesia. The main campus of the university is located in Kebon Jeruk, West Jakarta. Most of its campuses are located within the area of Greater Jakarta Region. It also has campuses at Bandung, Malang, Bekasi, and Semarang.

== History ==
Bina Nusantara University originally evolved from a computer training institute, Modern Computer Course, which was founded on October 21, 1974. Along with its development, the Modern Computer Course later developed into the Computer Engineering Academy (ATK) on July 1, 1981. The academy offers informatics and informatics management education. Three years later, on July 13, 1984, ATK achieved registered status, and the name changed to AMIK Jakarta. On July 1, 1985, AMIK opened a course in accounting computerization. AMIK began to use the name Bina Nusantara on September 21, 1985.

AMIK was awarded the Best Computer Academy Award from the Ministry of Education and Culture on March 17, 1986. AMIK Bina Nusantara then formed STMIK (College of Informatics and Computer Management) Bina Nusantara on July 1, 1986. The institute then offered undergraduate study programs (S1) in informatics management and informatics engineering.

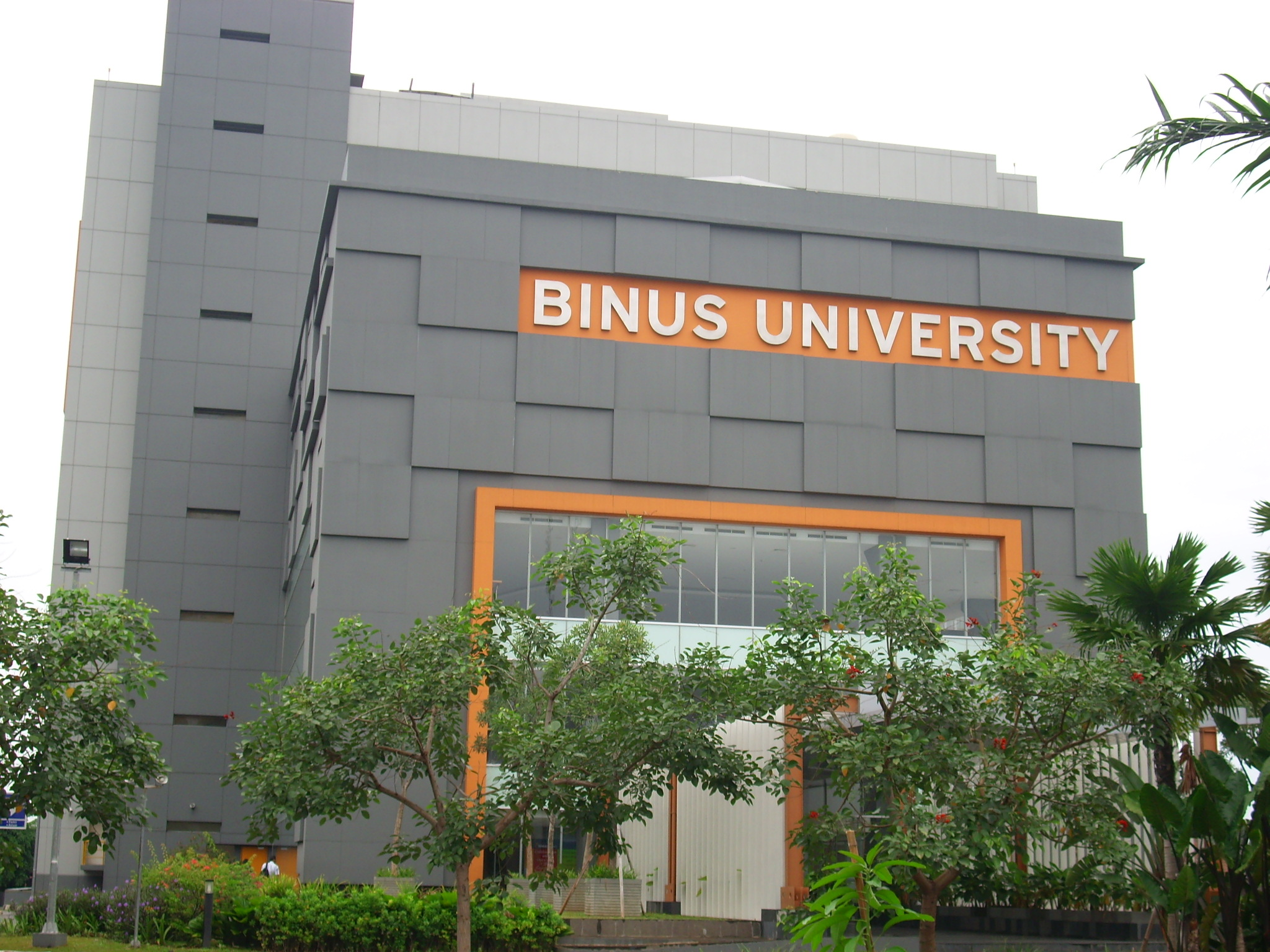
Anggrek Campus

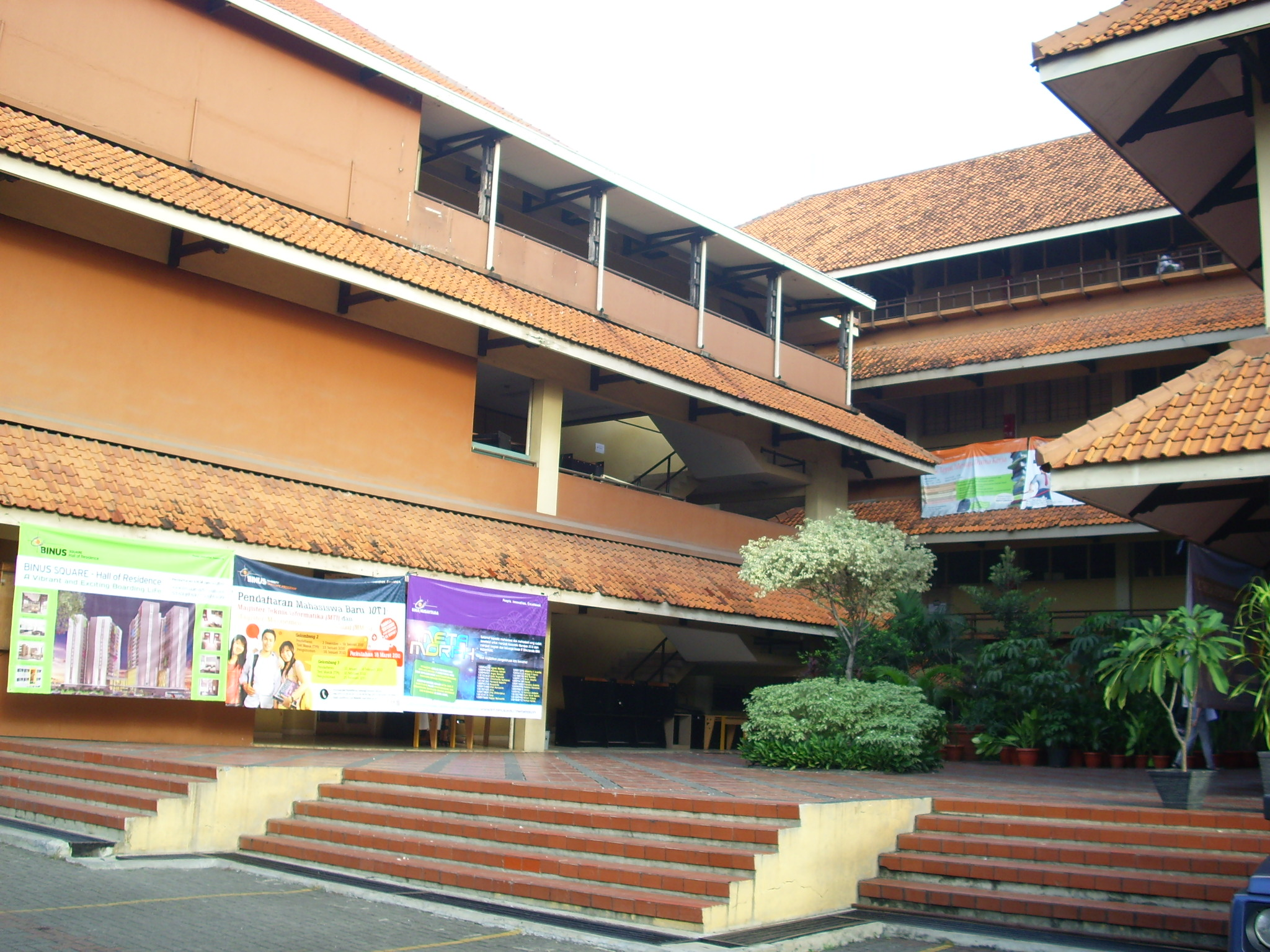
Syahdan Campus

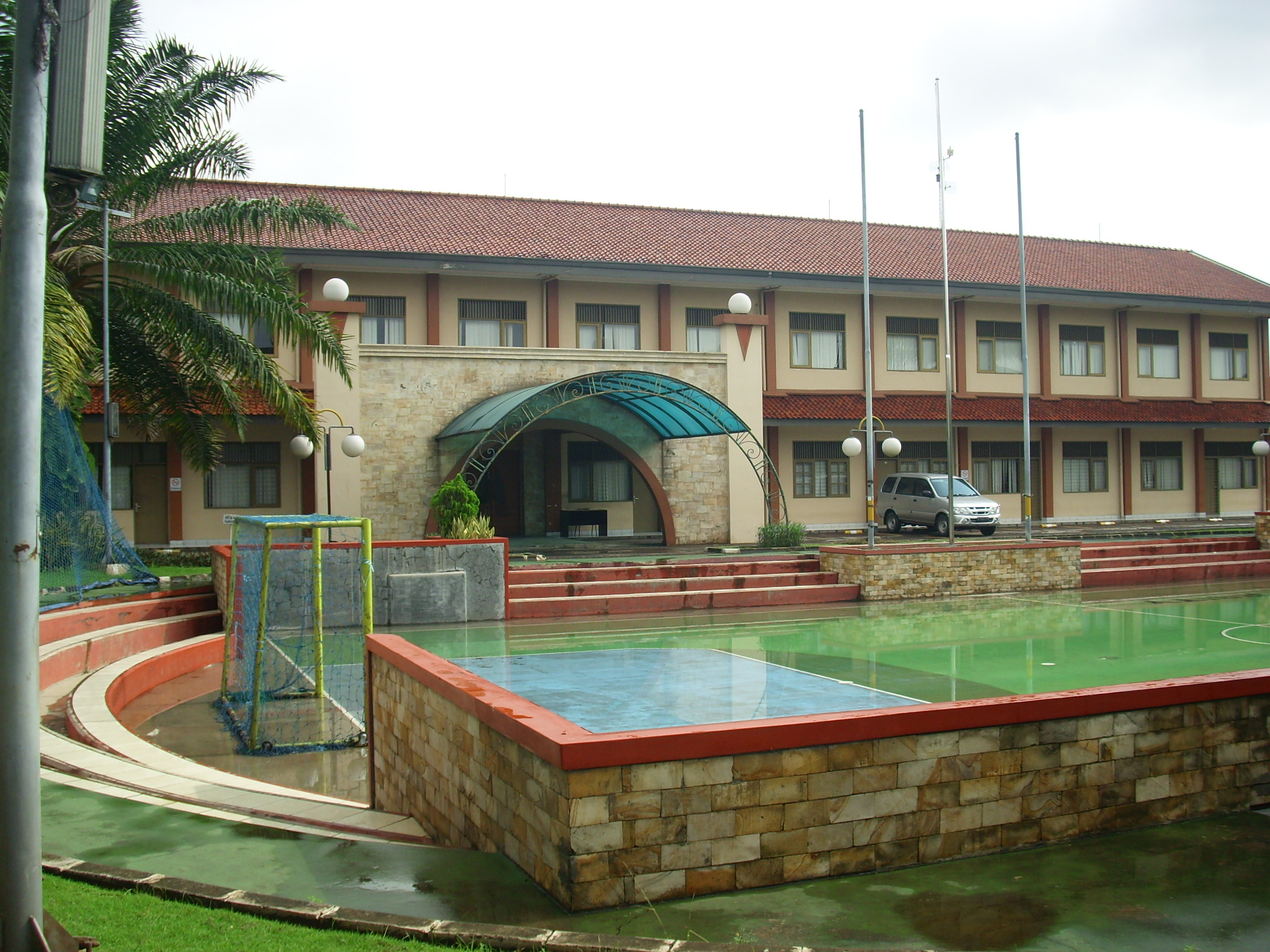
Kijang Campus

Bina Nusantara Alam Sutera Campus

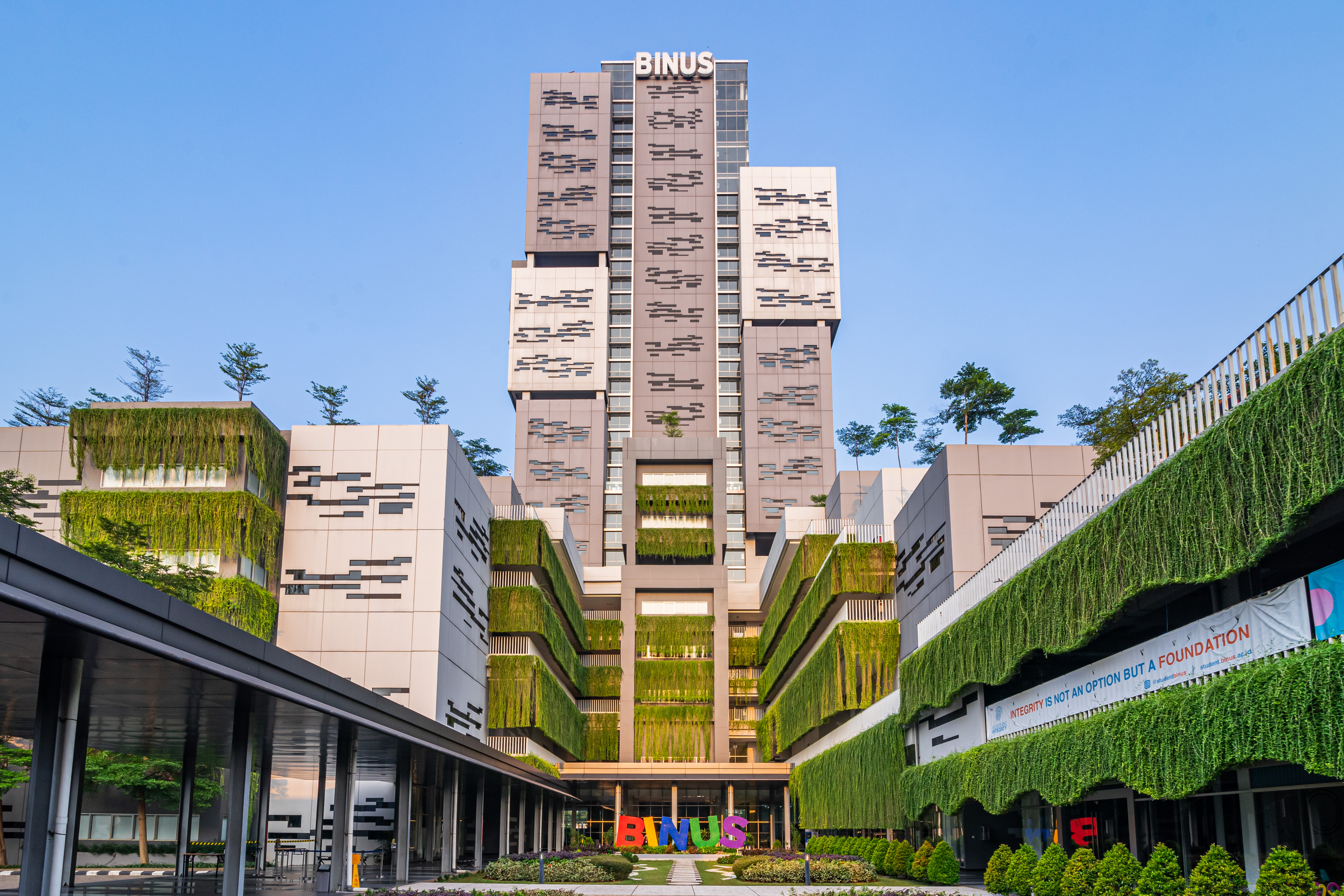
Alam Sutera Campus

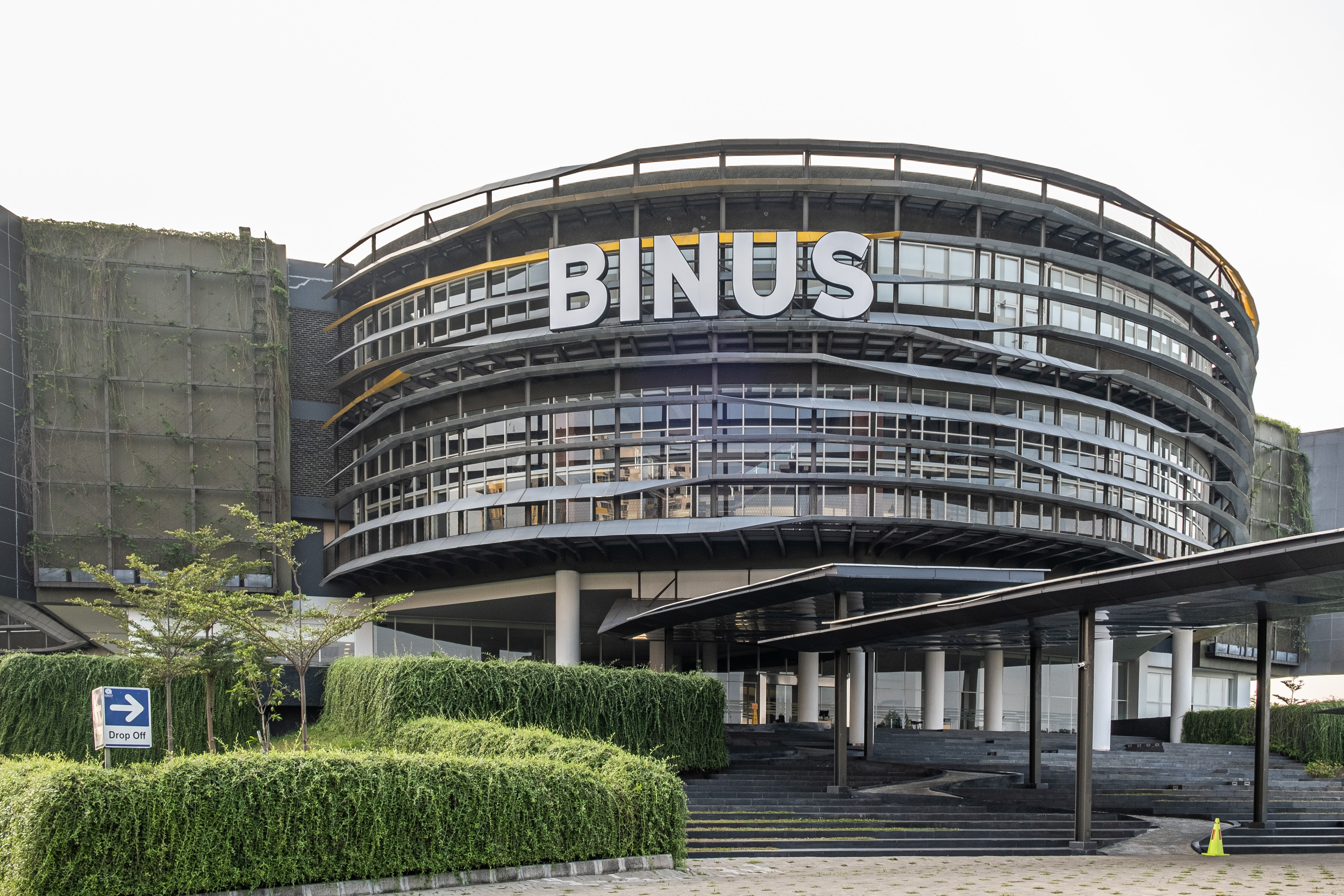
Bekasi Campus

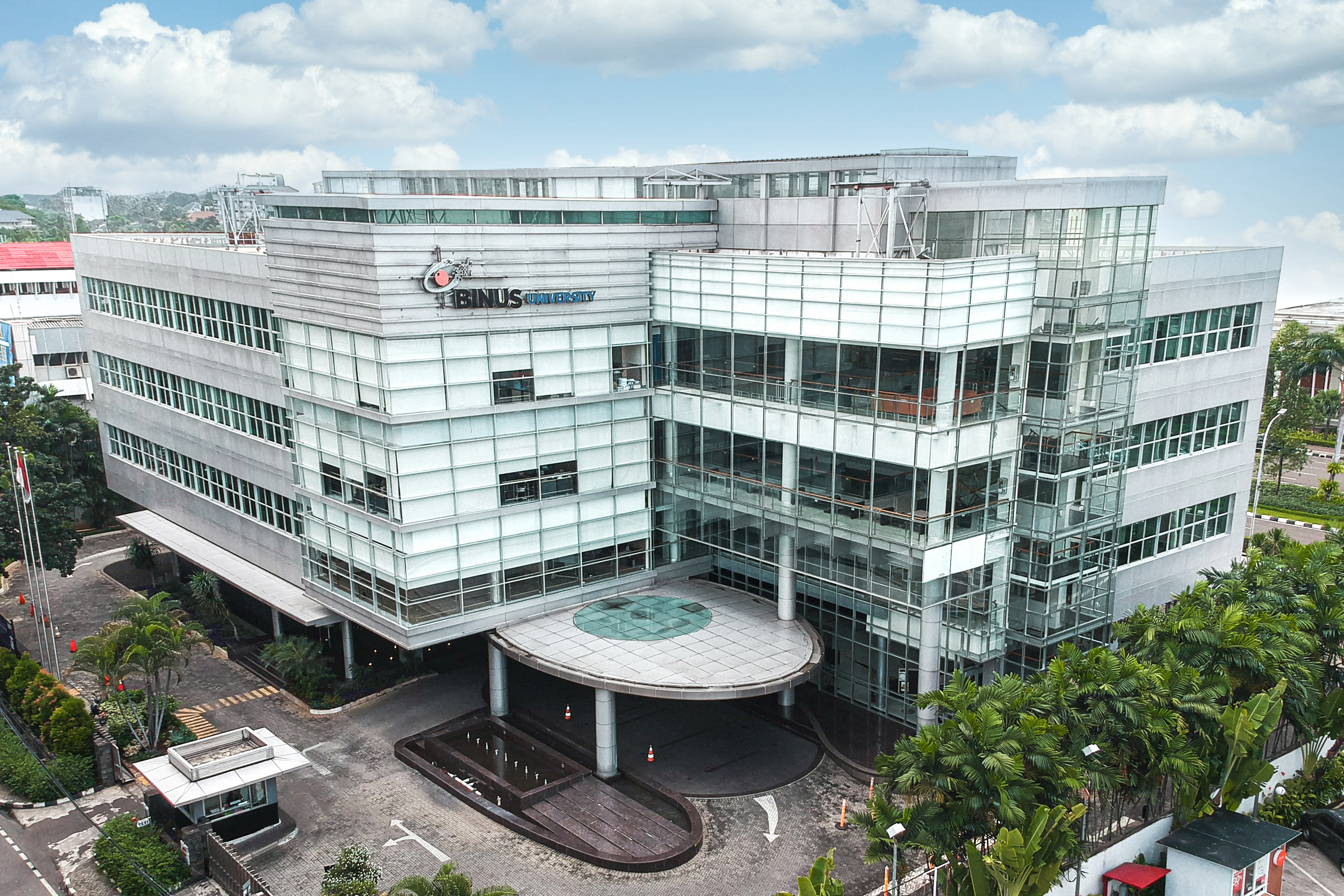
Senayan Campus

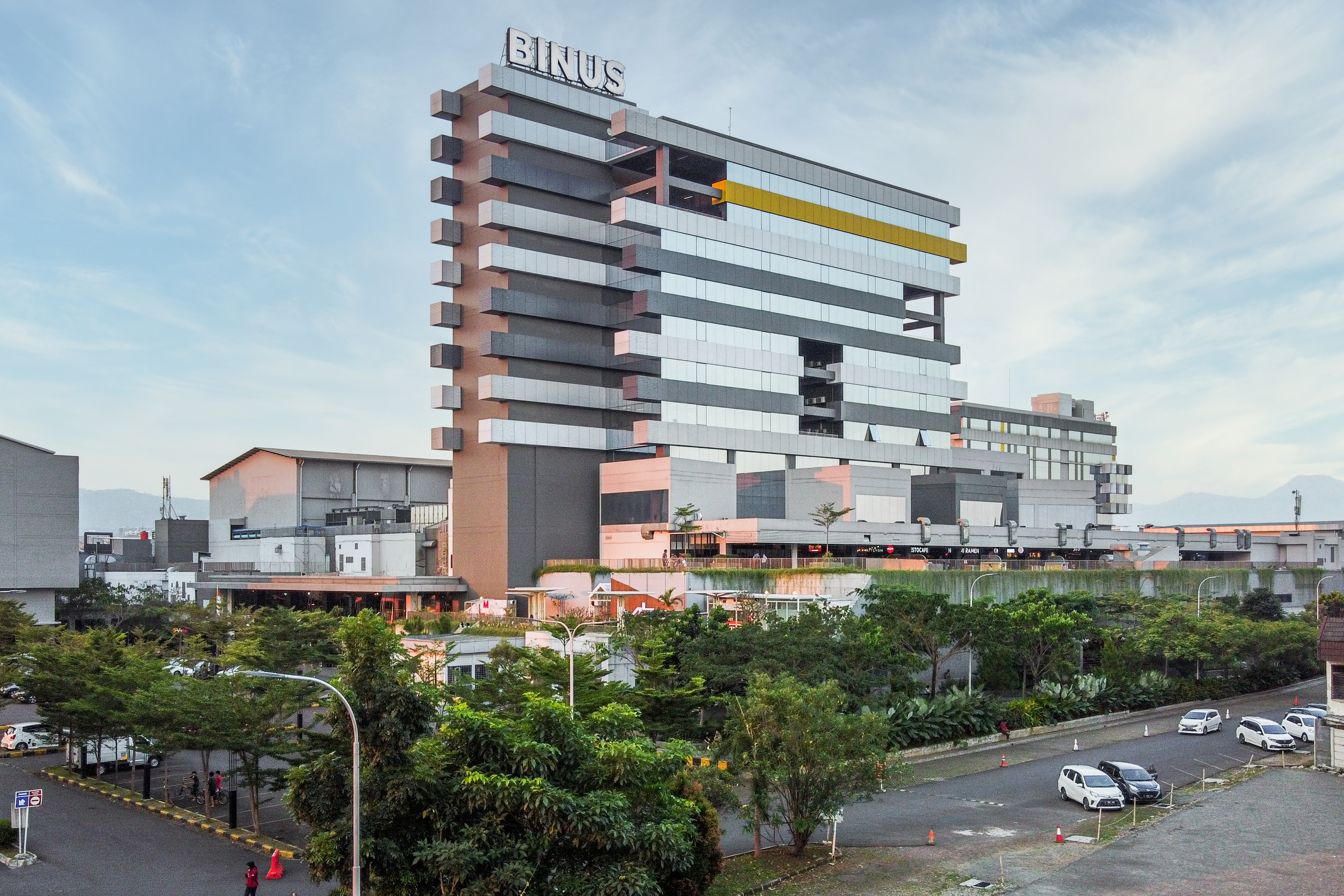
Bandung Campus

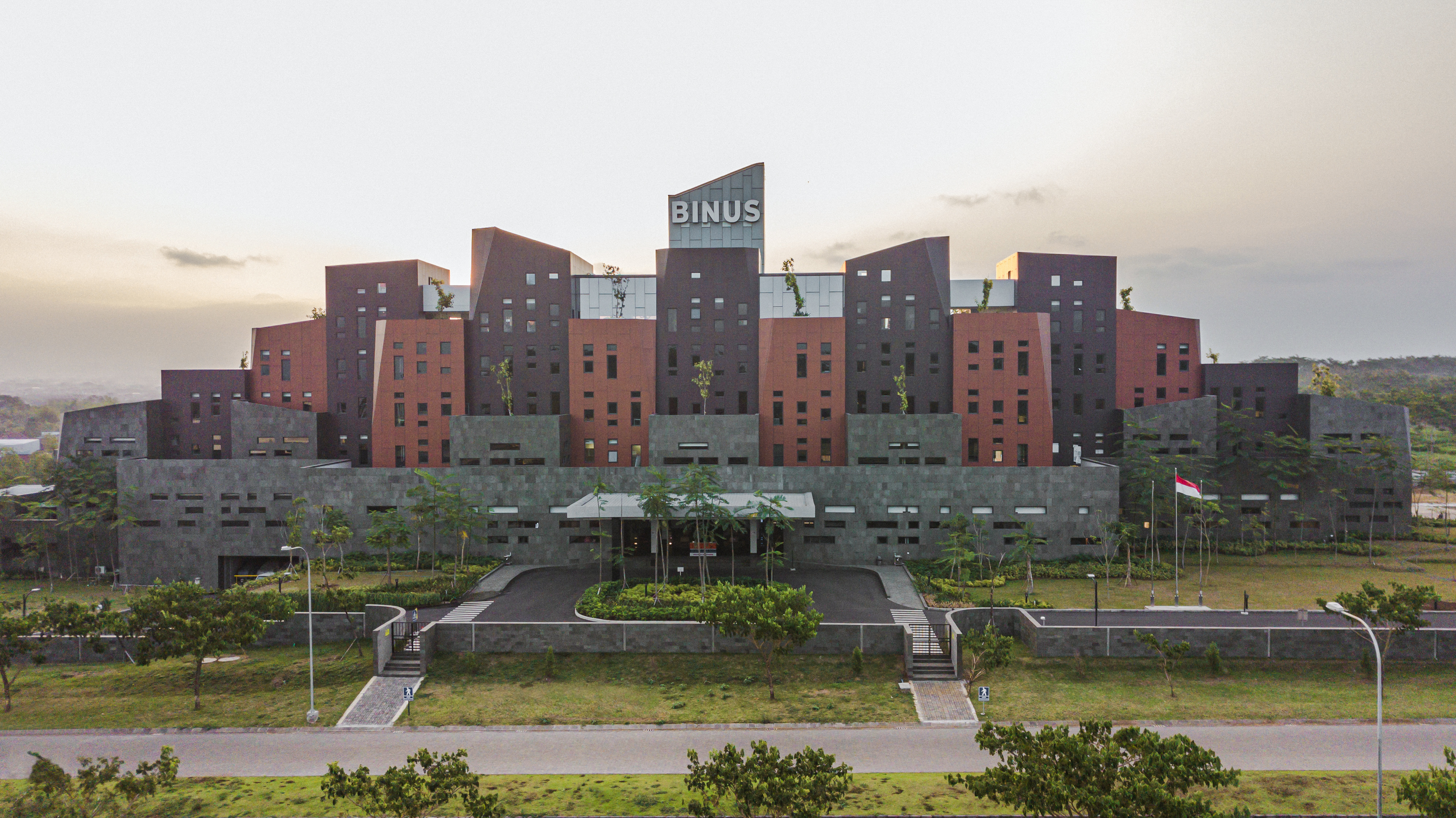
Malang Campus

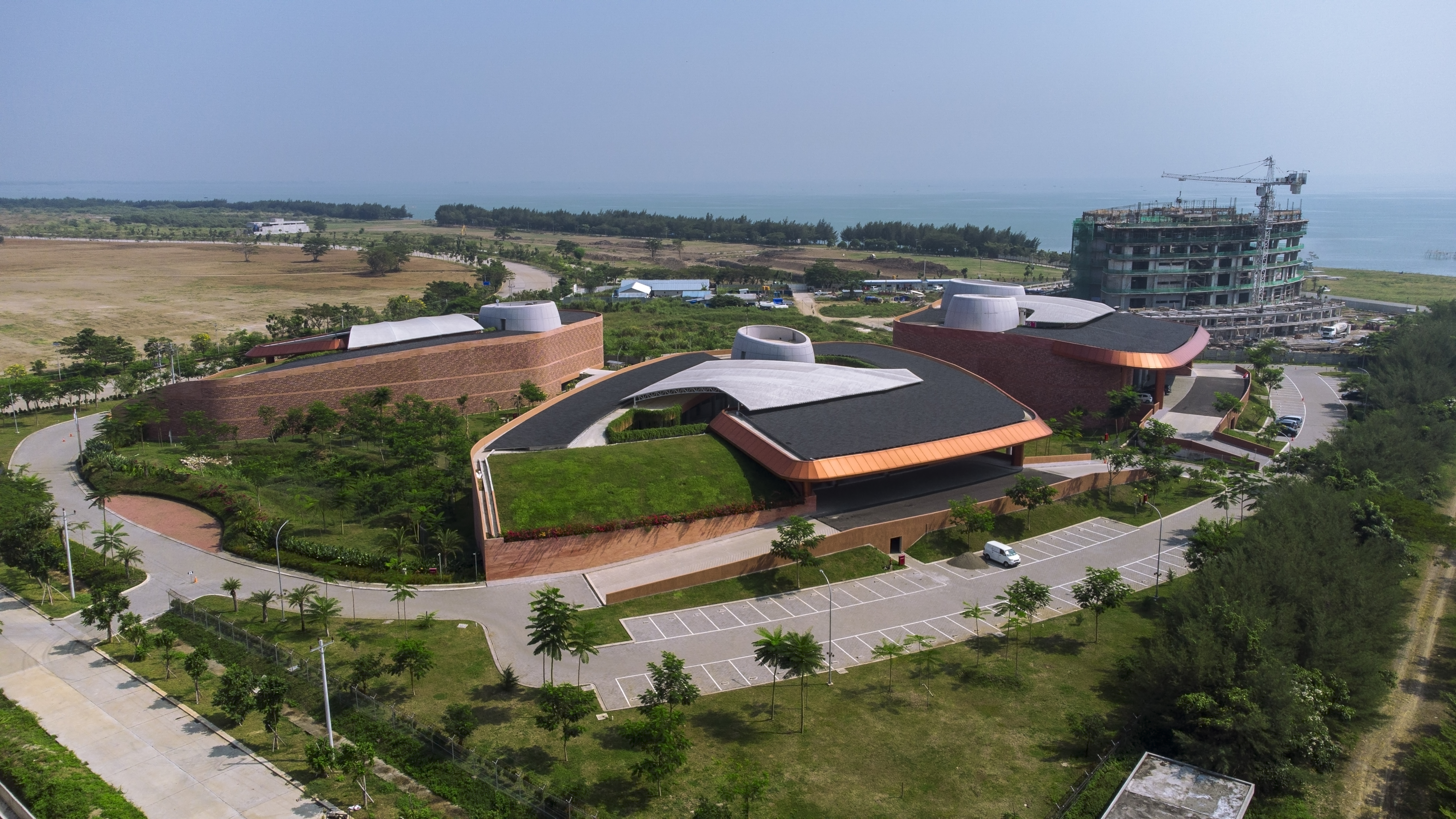
Semarang Campus

On November 9, 1987, AMIK Bina Nusantara joined STMIK Bina Nusantara to form an educational institution offering a diploma study program (D3) and strata 1 (S1). STMIK Bina Nusantara gained equal status for all courses on March 18, 1992. STMIK Bina Nusantara then opened a postgraduate program of information systems management, first in Indonesia on May 10, 1993.

Bina Nusantara University was established on August 8, 1996. STMIK Bina Nusantara then joined BINUS UNIVERSITY on December 20, 1998. Currently, BINUS UNIVERSITY has the following educational programs: School of Information Systems, School of Informatics Engineering, Faculty of Engineering, School of Business and Management, Faculty of Economics and Communication, School of Design, Faculty of Humanities, Master of Informatics Engineering, Master of Information Systems Management, Master of Business Management, and Doctoral of Management Research.

On October 23, 2014, BINUS UNIVERSITY launched its new campus by holding a grand launching of BINUS UNIVERSITY in Alam Sutera, Tangerang. The new campus is a 22-floor building and applies the concept of a green campus, an environmentally friendly building with the use of energy-saving facilities. A campus area of 25 thousand square meters was designed by Indonesian architects, namely Budiman. The A campus has four main courses. The four are computer science, school of design, school business and management, and information systems.

On April 29, 2015, BINUS and PT. Summarecon Agung Tbk. signed a new campus construction agreement at Summarecon Bekasi. The campus is planned to be built on an area of 36,400 sq m at Summarecon Bekasi City Circle Road Bulevar. For the initial phase, in March 2016, Binus will open an online learning facility: called BINUS UNIVERSITY LEARNING COMMUNITY (BULC) in Summarecon City, Bekasi, and the next stage Binus University campus will be fully operational by 2018. Now, Binus has 9 campuses in Indonesia, with all of them located in Java. 4 are located in Jakarta, while the others are located in Malang, Semarang, Bandung, Bekasi, and Tangerang.

== Rankings ==
University rankings

Global – Overall
- QS World: 851-900 (2026)

Regional – Overall
- QS Asia: 204 (2025)

== Courses ==
BINUS UNIVERSITY has three types of courses: regular, international, and online.

=== Regular program ===
There are three levels of regular courses provided by BINUS UNIVERSITY: undergraduate, master and doctorate levels.

==== Undergraduate level ====
BINUS UNIVERSITY offers undergraduate courses in single-degree and double-degree programs. The undergraduate degree has 3 faculties and 4 schools:

- Faculty of Economics and Communication
- Faculty of Engineering
- Faculty of Humanities
- School of Informatics Engineering
- School of Design
- School of Information Systems
- School of Business and Management

==== Master degree ====
BINUS UNIVERSITY offers master courses with a single degree and a double degree program in which students will earn two master's degrees, one from Bina Nusantara University and one from Macquarie University.

==== Doctorate level ====
The doctoral level has only two courses: Doctor of Computer Science (DCS) and Doctoral Research in Management (DRM).

=== International lecture courses ===
The international lecture program obtains a bachelor's degree from a foreign partner university.

=== Online courses ===
The online college program enables students to earn a bachelor's degree by studying remotely through the internet, and during the Corona pandemic in March 2020, students started to learn remotely most of the semesters from outside campuses of BINUS.

== Cooperation with foreign universities, institutes, and associations ==
Bina Nusantara cooperates with foreign universities from all around the region for general agreement, faculty mobility, joint degree or double degree, joint research, short or summer courses, student exchange, study abroad, and other activities.

== Notable alumni ==
- William Tanuwijaya, founder and CEO of Tokopedia
- Andrew Darwis, founder of Kaskus
- Zilvia Iskandar, journalist and news anchor for Metro TV
- Sumi Yang, journalist and news anchor for Metro TV
- Zackia Arfan, news anchor for Metro TV
- Jess No Limit, YouTuber and husband to Sisca Kohl
- Princess Megonondo, model, Miss World 2019 contestant
- Tina Toon, singer and member of Jakarta Regional House of Representatives
- Yunita Siregar, actress
- Enzy Storia, actress, model, presenter, singer
- Rico Sia, politician
- Rico Waas, 19th Mayor of Medan
- Clarissa Punipun, cosplayer, musician, gamer, physiognomist
