= GoTo (Indonesian company) =

Indonesian technology company

PT GoTo Gojek Tokopedia Tbk
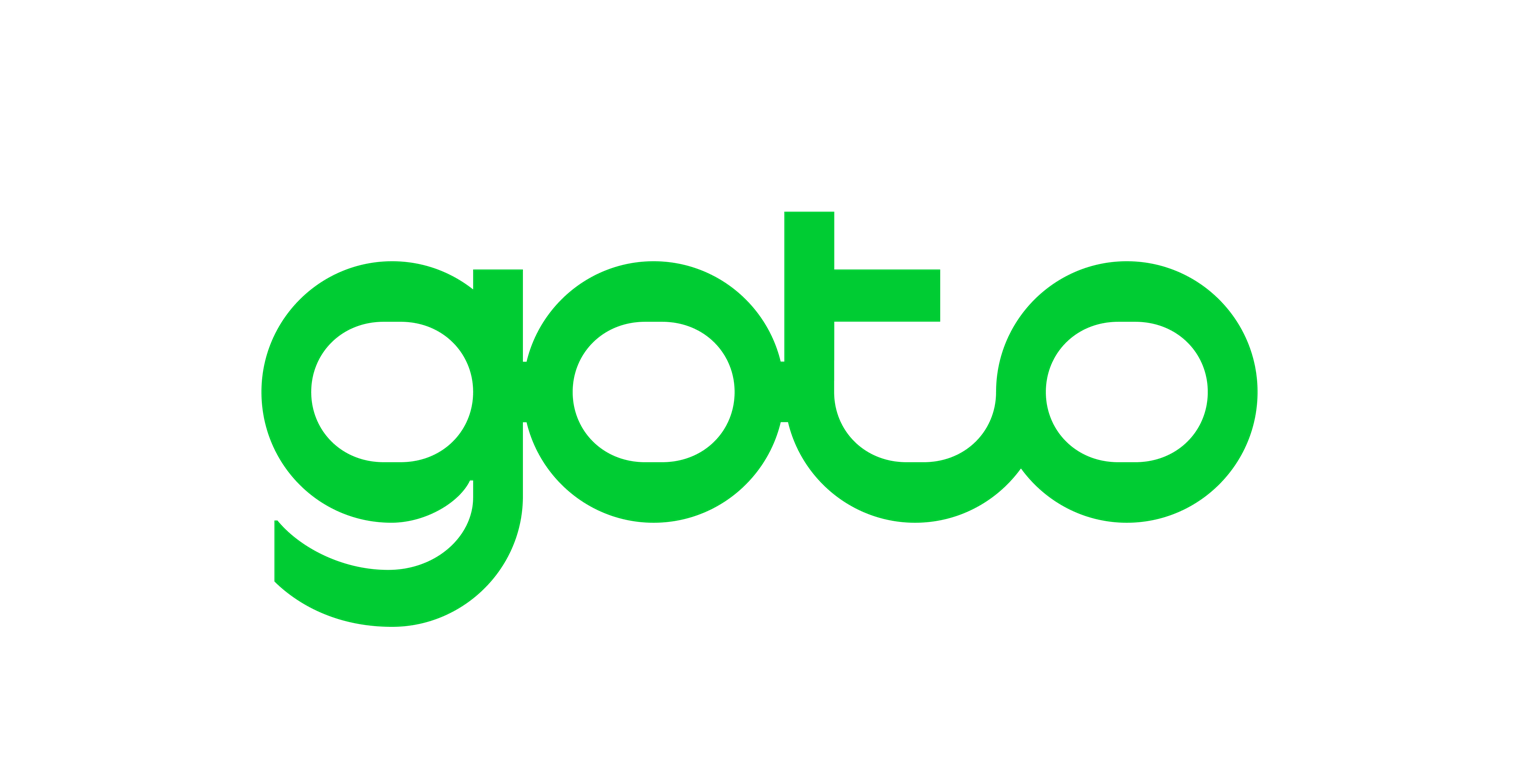
- Trade name: GoTo Group
- Type: Public
- Traded as: IDX: GOTO
- Industry: Technology
- Founded: 17 May 2021; 5 years ago
- Headquarters: Kebayoran Baru, South Jakarta, Indonesia
- Area served: Indonesia, Singapore
- Key people: Hans Patuwo (CEO)
- Brands: Gojek and GoPay
- Website: gotocompany.com/en

GoTo Group (PT GoTo Gojek Tokopedia Tbk) is an Indonesian technology company. Headquartered in Jakarta, it operates Indonesia's largest digital ecosystem, offering ride hailing, food deliveries, logistics, and financial services.

The company was formed in 2021 in a merger — the largest in the country at that time — between Gojek and Tokopedia. GoTo Group's current businesses include the on-demand services platform Gojek and the financial technology arm GoPay. It also owns 25% of Tokopedia.

== History ==
=== 2009-2021: Background and formation ===
GoTo was formed through the merger of two large Indonesian technology companies: Gojek and Tokopedia. Gojek was founded by Nadiem Makarim in 2010 as a call center and small motorcycle taxi service. It launched an app in 2015, and by 2018 had 18 separate on-demand services, including GoFood food delivery, GoMart grocery delivery, housecleaning, styling, and massages, among others. Its GoPay feature was used for transactions. Gojek become Indonesia's first unicorn startup in 2016, and in 2018 it expanded into Vietnam, Thailand, and Singapore.

The e-commerce platform Tokopedia was founded by William Tanuwijaya and Leontinus Alpha Edison in 2009. With funders such as Softbank Ventures, Sequoia Capital, and Alibaba, as it expanded, it acquired brands and subsidiaries such as a wedding marketplace, a credit scoring service, and logistics companies, among others. It reached unicorn status in 2017.

Gojek and Tokopedia merged into the new company PT GoTo Gojek Tokopedia Tbk on May 17, 2021. "GoTo" is an abbreviation of Gojek and Tokopedia, and also abbreviation of gotong-royong, a Javanese ethos meaning "working together". According to the South China Morning Post, the deal was the largest ever in Indonesian history, with the combined valuation of both companies estimated to be US$18 billion. The newly formed entity had 100 million monthly active users, more than 11 million merchants, and over 2 million drivers. Services were varied, with Bloomberg writing that "the merger created a company of remarkable breadth... it’s the rough equivalent of Amazon.com, DoorDash, Netflix, PayPal, and Uber combined."

=== 2021-2023: Restructuring and IPO ===
By mid 2021, GoTo was the most valuable startup in Indonesia and contributed to about 2% of the country's GDP. Among GoTo's investors were Softbank, Alibaba, Tencent, and Facebook. In July 2021, GoTo sold Gojek Thailand (Velox Technology Thailand Co Ltd) to AirAsia. In November 2021, GoTo Group raised $1.3 billion from investors such as the Abu Dhabi Investment Authority, Google, Fidelity International, and Tencent Holdings.

On April 11, 2022, GoTo listed on the Indonesia Stock Exchange with a $1.1 billion IPO at a price of 338 IDR per share, climbing more than 15% to 388 IDR in the first day of trading. In October 2022, GoTo ranked #13 on the Fortune change the world list, the highest ranking of any Southeast Asian company. At the time, GoTo was also described as one of three super-app giants in Southeast Asia (other than Grab and Shopee).

In February 2023, William Tanuwijaya was succeeded as head of Tokopedia by Melissa Siska Juminto, while remaining a GoTo co-chairman. Patrick Walujo was named CEO of GoTo Group in June 2023, succeeding Andrew Soelistyo. In early 2023, GoTo began combining Gojek and Tokopedia's delivery and fulfillment services into the newly formed GoTo Logistics. In July 2023, GoTo launched the e-wallet GoPay in Indonesia. The app was a standalone version of the Gojek GoPay app first launched in 2016, which had previously only been available to Gojek and Tokopedia users. In September 2023, GoTo sold the on-demand video platform GoPlay (PT Produksi Kreatif Anak Bangsa). In December 2023, TikTok's parent company ByteDance agreed to acquire 75% shares of Tokopedia, with GoTo retaining a 25% stake.

In September 2023, Tik Tok faced issues in Indonedia over legality.

=== 2024-2026: Recent years ===
In late 2024, GoTo Group signed five-year contracts with Tencent and Alibaba to migrate to their cloud platforms. GoTo announced in June 2025 that all of its on-demand services systems had been migrated to Tencent Cloud, and that GoTo Financial's infrastructure had been moved to Alibaba Cloud's data centers in Jakarta.

GoTo Group's shareholders approved the appointment of Hans Patuwo as CEO and president director on December 17, 2025, succeeding Patrick Walujo. In January 2026, GoTo had a market capitalization of about US$4.2 billion. Reuters reported in April 2026 that GoTo had seen its first quarterly net profit since the Gojek-Tokpedia merger, attributed to revenue growth and tighter cost controls. The company remains headquartered in Jakarta.

== Businesses and services ==
The company currently holds a 25% stake in the e-commerce company Tokopedia. It fully owns the financial technology business GoTo Financial, and also owns the on-demand services business Gojek. While Gojek operates brands such as GoCar and GoFood, GoTo Financial operates brands such as the e-wallet GoPay, the buy now, pay later service GoPay Later, and the point-of-sale application Moka.

=== Gojek ===
See also: List of Gojek products

Gojek is GoTo Group's on-demand multiservice platform. It provides access to services such as transportation, food delivery, and goods delivery, among others. It also has apps for businesses such as merchant and payment portals. The Gojek PLUS subscription program lowers prices with a monthly fee. Outside Indonesia, Gojek also operates in Singapore, where its GoCar ride service brand is available.

Services currently provided by Gojek include:

- GoRide - motorcycle taxi (ojek) ride-hailing service
- GoCar - car ride-hailing service
- GoBlueBird - taxi booking service, in partnership with Blue Bird Group
- GoSend (PT Paket Anak Bangsa), item delivery, C2C instant and same-day delivery services
- GoBox - moving service and bulky-item delivery
- GoGreenSM - travel planner and booking service
- GoFood - food delivery services in partnership with restaurants, cafes, and kiosks, with a GoFood Merchant app for businesses
- GoMart - on-demand delivery from grocery and convenience stores
- GoShop - on-demand personal concierge service allowing consumers to shop for items and have them delivered
- GoCorp, platform for corporate clients to easily access and monitor business-related trips for their employees

=== Financial technology ===
GoTo's financial technology division has a number of brands and services for consumers and businesses, including digital wallets, insurance, and loans. Its primary product is the payment app GoPay. As of 2025, around 3% of the gross domestic product in Indonesia was processed within the GoPay app system.

Brands and services as of 2026 include:

- GoPay (PT Dompet Anak Bangsa) - originally a Gojek-only financial app, GoPay currently provides digital wallet services as a standalone product
- GoPay Merchant - designed for businesses to manage QRIS payments and allows payout schedules to banks
- GoPay Spiker - accepts QRIS payments securely with instant sound alerts
- GoPayLater (PT Multifinance Anak Bangsa), a buy now, pay later service for goods and services ordered through the GoTo ecosystem. Previously named Findaya (PT Mapan Global Reksa), it was rolled into GoTo Financial from Gojek in 2021
- GoPay Pinjam - cash loan services
- GoPay Tabungan by Jago - savings product by Bank Jago on the GoPay app
- GoPay Asuransi - health insurance service with Prodigi as the broker, with products from Oona Insurance
- GoPay Simpanan - savings product
- Moka - point-of-sale (POS) system
- Midtrans (PT Midtrans) - tech-based finance service for companies for accepting payment and disbursements, which offers a payment gateway
- digisign - electronic signatures and digital certificates
- a "digital identity" know-your-customer product with face recognition

=== Tokopedia ===
See also: List of Tokopedia products and services

As of 2026, GoTo Group is a minority owner in Tokopedia, one of Indonesia's most popular online shopping portals.

== See also ==
- List of largest Internet companies
