= Jess No Limit =

Indonesian YouTuber (born 1996)

- Born: Tobias Justin; 5 February 1996 (age 30); Jakarta, Indonesia
- Education: BINUS University
- Occupations: YouTuber; Internet celebrity
- Spouse: Sisca Kohl (m. 2022)

YouTube information
- Channels: Jess No Limit; JessNoLimit Gaming; Grace No Limit
- Years active: 2017–present
- Genres: Online game; Streaming media; Practical joke; Entertainment
- Subscribers: 54.5 million (main account); 54.797 million (combined) (Note: Subscribers, broken down by channel: 54.500.000 (Jess No Limit) 177.000 (Jess No Limit 2) 88.100 (Jess No Limit Gaming) 32.400 (Grace No Limit))
- Views: 7.266 billion (main account); 7.268 billion (combined) (Note: Views, broken down by channel: 7.266.499.880 (Jess No Limit) 387.490 (Jess No Limit Gaming) 1.375.314 (Grace No Limit))
- Last updated: 2 June 2026

Tobias Justin (born 5 February 1996), known professionally as Jess No Limit, is an Indonesian YouTuber and internet celebrity of Chinese descent. Jess No Limit is Justin's main YouTube channel with the most subscribers in Indonesia. He also runs several other YouTube channels named Grace No Limit, Jess No Limit Gaming and Jess No Limit Shorts. In 2023, Jess No Limit succeeded in surpassing Ricis Official as the YouTuber with the most subscribers in Indonesia.

In April 2025, Justin was recognized by Guinness World Records with two records: Most subscribers for an Indonesian language channel on YouTube and Most subscribers for an Indonesian language gaming channel on YouTube

== Biography ==
=== Personal life ===
Justin began playing online games when he was in elementary school. He typically purchased a ten-hour gaming package at an Internet café. When he entered college, he sold various vouchers, earning him profits ranging from tens to hundreds of millions of rupiah. This was largely due to his participation in an investment program. His sister name Jessica Jane, born on August 20, 1999, is also a YouTuber with over 10 million subscribers.

In 2018, Justin joined a group for Ruangguru with Misellia Ikwan, Gita Savitri Devi and Jefri Nichol.

Justin is a Catholic. On 10 October 2022, he officially married fellow internet celebrity Sisca Kohl at the Vincentius A Paulo Chapel in Central Jakarta. On 8 September 2023, Justin welcomed a daughter, Sophia Eleanor Justin.

== Career ==
=== Electronic Sports ===
Justin won the Mobile Legends: Bang Bang online tournament, placing second worldwide in the fourth season, and first in the sixth season. He then joined the EVOS esports team. However, in October 2019, the team officially announced that Jess was no longer a member. Several months before this news broke, the Indonesian government officially appointed him as an ambassador for the President's Cup Esports that same year.

=== YouTuber ===
In April 2020, he officially became a YouTuber with online gaming and e-sports content in Indonesia, which for the first time managed to break the ten million subscriber mark, and continued to grow to fifteen million subscribers in just two months. In the same month, he also auctioned his watch to help victims affected by the COVID-19 pandemic. This auction was won by a YouTuber named Indra Kesuma for 260 million rupiah.

=== Giveaway ===
Justin is also known as a content pioneer who gave away free smartphones and laptops from various brands to his subscribers. In June 2020, Jess No Limit held a poll on his YouTube community post, asking them to continue or stop giving away giveaways on his channel. Of the 1.1 million people who participated in the poll, 84 percent voted in favor of continuing the giveaway.

A few days later, Justin asked his fans in a YouTube community post on Jess No Limit's channel for suggestions regarding loyalty badge images for his membership feature. In the replies to the post, many of his fans asked him to stop the giveaways, citing their growing tired of the phrase "Be yourself and never surrender" in the comments of every Jess No Limit video. In response, he created a special video on Jess No Limit's channel titled "Tolong..." (lit. 'Help...'). In the video, he asked his fans not to spam the phrase "Be yourself and never surrender" in the comments of his videos.

Afterward, he held another poll on his YouTube channel's community post, offering the following options: continue the giveaway by providing your Instagram username in the comments section of a specific video to participate, or stop the giveaway and donate the funds to those in need. Of the 1.1 million people who participated in the poll, 86 percent agreed to stop the giveaway and donate the funds to those in need.

Finally, Justin uploaded an announcement video on his YouTube channel titled "Pengumuman YouTube Penting (tolong ditonton)" (lit. 'Important YouTube Announcement (please watch)'). In the video, he announced that he would be holding a giveaway with three smartphones as prizes to fulfill his previous promise. To enter, he filled out a Google Form he created. No subscription to his channel, no likes of his videos, and no Instagram usernames were required to participate. The video also stated that he would be donating the remaining giveaway funds to Ridwan Perjuangan Melawan Kepaluhan Anak Tanpa Orang Tua on kitabisa.com and to the Floating Hospital.

== Web series ==
Year	Title	Role	Production	Channel	Description
2021	Sumber Rejeki The Series	Jess No Limit	Genesis Dogma Production	Vision+	Guest Stars

== Television show ==
Year	Title	Role	Television Station
2018	Indonesia Morning Show	Guest Star	NET.
2018	Indonesian Choice Awards	Guest Star	NET.
2018	Hitam Putih	Guest Star	Trans 7
2020	I'm Possible	Guest Star	Metro TV
2020	Good Gamer	Guest Star	Kompas TV

== Award ==
Year	Award	Date	Category	Result	Ref
2018	Indonesian Choice Awards 5.0	April 29, 2018	Digital Persona of the Year	Won	
2020	MLBB All-Stars 2020 Indonesia 515 eParty	May 6, 2020	MLBB Best Progress KOL	Won	
2020	MLBB All-Stars 2020 Indonesia 515 eParty	May 6, 2020	MLBB KOL of the Year	Won	
2020	MLBB All-Stars 2020 Indonesia 515 eParty	May 6, 2020	MLBB Most Popular KOL	Won	
2025	Indonesian Creator Night	October 30, 2025	Most Viewed Top Subscribers	Recipient	

== See also ==
- List of most-subscribed YouTube channels
- Sisca Kohl

== Notes ==
Preceded by Ria Ricis	YouTuber with the most subscribers in Indonesia; 2023-present	Succeeded by N/A
