= William Tanuwijaya =

Indonesian entrepreneur

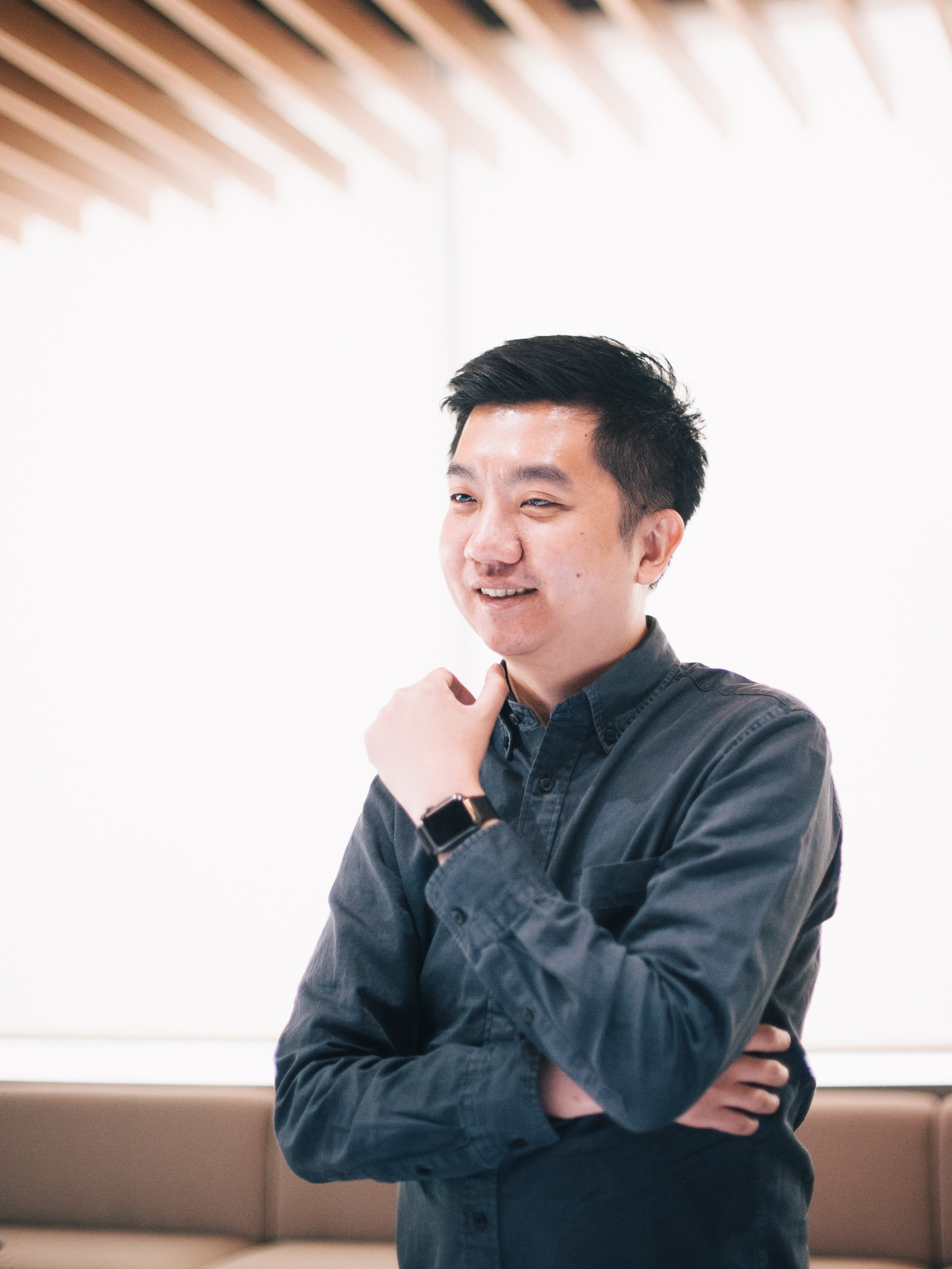
- Born: 11 November 1981 (age 44); Pematang Siantar, North Sumatra, Indonesia
- Education: BINUS University; Harvard Kennedy School
- Occupation: Internet entrepreneur
- Known for: Co-Founder, Tokopedia
- Title: Chairman and CEO of Tokopedia; Co-Chairman of GoTo
- Spouse: Felicia HW

William Tanuwijaya (born 11 November 1981) is an Indonesian entrepreneur. He is the co-founder of Tokopedia, an Indonesian technology company with a leading e-commerce business. Tanuwijaya represents Indonesia as a Young Global Leader at World Economic Forum. In 2019, he received a Medal of Honor (Indonesian: Satyalencana Wira Karya) from the President of the Republic of Indonesia for his contribution to Indonesia's technology and economic growth.

== Early life and education ==
Tanuwijaya was born in Pematangsiantar, North Sumatra, Indonesia. He graduated from high school there, and his family was the middle income who supported his education. William went to college at BINUS University and later studied at the Harvard Kennedy School.

To pay for college, Tanuwijaya worked part-time. He worked in an internet cafe twelve hours a day up until his graduated in 2003. He then worked as a software developer in companies including Telkomsigma and Sqiva Sistem. He later worked as a game developer at Bolehnet. In 2006, Tanuwijaya worked as the IT and business development manager at Indocom Mediatama.

== Business career ==
=== Tokopedia ===
In 2007, Tanuwijaya started to build Tokopedia, He asked his friend, Leontinus Alpha Edison, to join him as co-founder, an e-commerce startup that connects Indonesian buyers and sellers for free. At the same time his father was diagnosed with cancer.

On February 6, 2009, Tokopedia officially launched. At that year's Indonesia Celebration of Independence on August 17 Tokopedia opened for public access. In October 2014, Tokopedia received US$100 million from Softbank Internet and Media and Sequoia Capital. Tokopedia announced its next stage of investment on August 17, 2017 for $1.1 billion, from Alibaba Group.

=== Other activities ===
In 2016, Tanuwijaya represented Indonesia as a Young Global Leader at the World Economic Forum. Tanuwijaya is one of the founders of Indonesia eCommerce Association (IdEA) and serves as a member of its supervisory board.
