= Clarissa Punipun =

Indonesian cosplayer

- Born: Clarissa Widjaya; October 7, 1992 (age 34)
- Other name: Punipun7, Punipun
- Occupations: professional cosplayer, Content creator, musician, gamer
- Years active: 2006–present
- Spouse: William Tong (m. 2025)
- Website: Official website

Clarissa Widjaya, also known as Punipun7, Punipun, or Clarissa Punipun (born October 7, 1992), is an Indonesian professional cosplayer, gamer, musician, entrepreneur, and physiognomist. Punipun has contributed various achievements in the field of cosplay. She won 2nd place in the Viewer's Choice Award category and was a finalist in the NHK Kawai.i International competition, as well as the winner of the 2019 Indonesia Game Awards in the Most Favorite Cosplayer of the Year category. She is also the Official Cosplayer for re:ON Comics and has served as both a Talent/Head Maid and Guest Cosplayer at the Anime Festival Asia (SOZO) event in Singapore, Malaysia, and Indonesia from 2012 to the present. Punipun is also actively involved as a Brand Ambassador for ASUS Republic of Gamers, Dunia Games, and the Kurate Gakuen Moe Ambassador in Fukuoka, Japan.

== Personal life ==
Clarissa Punipun lives in Jakarta, Indonesia. She started cosplaying in 2006. Her interest in cosplay began because she loves anime, manga, and games. Punipun enjoys playing music and photography. She can play various musical instruments such as the piano, drums, guitar, bass, and cello. Clarissa Punipun is of Indonesian, Chinese, Japanese, and Malay descent. She is the eldest of three siblings.

As a child, Punipun was interested in becoming a scientist and doctor. As time went by, she was interested in IT. Punipun decided to continue her studies in IT by studying at the University of Nottingham majoring in Software Engineering and at BINUS University majoring in computer science. She graduated in four years, then worked in IT at a company for five years, before deciding to pursue a career as a professional cosplayer and entrepreneur. Throughout her career, Punipun has been a judge and guest cosplayer at more than 100 cosplay events both domestically and internationally. Her achievements have earned her the title of Brand Ambassador for GeekFam, ASUS Republic of Gamers, Lugiami, and Dunia Games.

Punipun is also famous for her expertise in reading a person's character through their face, a practice known as physiognomy. She claims to see a person's character, past, future, and old age just by looking at their face.

== Biography ==
=== Brand Ambassador ===
Year	Event	Role
2017-present	ASUS ROG Indonesia	Brand Amabssador
2019-2021	GeekFam ESport Team	Brand Ambassador
2021-2021	Lugiami SouthEast Asia	Brand Ambassador
2021-present	Dunia Games Indonesia	Brand Ambassador

=== IT ===
Year	Event	Role
2012	Microsoft CHAMPS Dreamspark	Trainee
2012	Microsoft CHAMPS Dreamspark	Trainer Hackathon 2012

=== Cosplay ===
Year	Event	Role
2012-present	Anime Festival Asia	Talent/Head Maid on AFA Cafe and Guest Star Cosplayer
2013-present	Over 100 National and International Events	Guest Cosplayer/Judge Cosplayer
2013	Lawson Indonesia at Ennichisai Blok M	Official Mascot Akikoloid-chan
2015-present	re:ON Comics	Official Cosplayer as Oren
2017	Kurate Gakuen Fukuoka, Japan	MOE Ambassador
2019	NHK Kawa.i International Japan	Top 10 Finalist
2019	NHK Kawai.i International Japan	#1 Runner up Viewers Choice
2019	Indonesia Game Awards	#1 Most Favorite Cosplayer of the Year

=== Business ===
Year	Event	Role
2020-present	Kopi Chuseyo Kota Wisata & HAKO Studio	Owner

== Discography ==
=== Single ===
Title	Role(s)	Year	Label(s)
"Secret Base (From Ano Hana)" (feat. KenForce Music)	Vocalist	2018	Self-released single
"Grand Escape (From Weathering with You 天気の子)" (feat. megu)	Vocalist	2020	Self-released single
"Uchiage Hanabi/Fireworks (From Fireworks)" (feat. Christian Bong & Franzeska Edelyn)	Cellist	2020	Self-released single
"Harvest Moon:Back to Nature Soundtrack (From Harvest Moon:Back to Nature)" (feat. Gema Show Indo, Balum, Tara Arts Game Indonesia)	Cellist & Pianist	2020	Self-released single
"Shirushi (From Sword Art Online II" (feat. Ferry Lie, Michael Nico, Albert Abraham)	Vocalist	2020	
