= On-demand =

On-demand or on demand may refer to:

== Manufacturing ==
- Build-on-demand
- Just-in-time manufacturing, a methodology for production
- Print on demand, printing technology and business process in which new copies of a document are not printed until an order has been received

== Computing and Internet ==
- Certification on demand, a digital certificate process
- Code on demand, a concept in distributed computing
- Ballot on Demand, software used to generate paper ballots, provided by Election Systems & Software
- Gaming on demand, a type of online gaming
- On-demand event is pre-recorded materials available anytime
- Content on demand:
  - Video on demand, a type of streaming video or movie service used by services such as Netflix
  - Music on demand, music streaming services like iTunes

== Television and video media providers ==
- Astro On Demand, a Cantonese-language TV service
- On Demand (Sky), a video on demand service for BSkyB's Sky satellite TV service

== Other uses ==
- Demand responsive transport, public transit service
- Personal rapid transit, an on-demand transport service
