= Build-on-demand =

Manufacturing business model

Build-on-demand or manufacturing on demand (MOD) refers to a manufacturing process where goods are produced only when or as they are required. This allows scalability and adjustable assemblies depending on the current needs of the part requestor or client.

Manufacturing on demand has the potential to markedly affect the manufacturing industry by shortening lead times and reducing costs. Manufacturing previously relied on Request for quotes (RfQs) that were not digitally obtainable.

== Examples ==
Audio and video discs
Recordable discs with audio and/or video content can be published from companies to customers via manufacture on demand. This differs from traditional releases as the discs are only produced on demand, rather than being stored in a warehouse, eliminating inventory. Many companies have taken advantage of this new process, including Warner Bros. (Warner Archive Collection), Smithsonian Folkways (Custom CDs), and Sony.

== See also ==
- On-demand (disambiguation)
- Just-in-time manufacturing
- Print on demand
