= Sisca Kohl =

Indonesian internet celebrity (born 2000)

- Born: August 23, 2000 (age 25); Jakarta Barat, DKI Jakarta, Indonesia
- Education: University of New South Wales (AOS)
- Occupations: Internet celebrity; YouTuber; Singer

YouTube information
- Channel: Sisca Kohl
- Years active: 2016–present
- Subscribers: 7.87 million
- Views: 1.016 billion
- Last updated: March 21, 2026

Sisca Kohl (born August 23, 2000) is an Indonesian internet celebrity. She and her sister Aliyyah, who are Chinese Indonesians, are mostly known for being content-creators on TikTok since 2018.

Most of their content is filmed in their house which features an elevator, billiard room and a gym. Their videos have attracted significant attention for flaunting their wealth and displaying high amounts of money, such as selling nasi goreng for 400 million rupiah and purchasing expensive imported food. They also went viral for turning different kinds of food (BTS Meal, nasi padang and peking duck) into ice cream.

Sisca first started making make-up videos, however her food reviews yielded higher user numbers. Her unique edited voice sets her apart from other YouTubers, and the phrases such as mari kita coba (lit. let's try it) are now associated with her brand.

Her content is similar to other Indonesian internet celebrities such as Jessica Jane (sister of Jess No Limit). Her secretive nature has led to speculation regarding her possible family relatives.

== YouTube Career and Achievements of Sisca Kohl ==
Sisca Kohl is a Celebgram and TikToker with a large following on social media.

She uploads content on her YouTube account, such as opening her childhood piggy bank containing hundreds of millions of rupiah, buying 45 packs of BTS Meals, or making seblak-flavored ice cream, and from Indonesian foods like pecel lele, nasi padang, and instant noodles.

These contents have successfully caught the attention of netizens and made the name Sisca Kohl increasingly popular. On the other hand, Sisca also has talent in academics. She is a graduate of Santa Ursula BSD High School, and is currently pursuing education at the University of New South Wales (UNSW) in Sydney.

She is majoring in Bachelor of Commerce, which focuses on Business and Economics. She is also fluent in English and Mandarin, in addition to Indonesia Language.

== Family ==
In late 2022, she married the YouTuber Jess No Limit (real name Tobias Justin). On 4 May 2023, it was revealed via a video from her husband on his YouTube and TikTok accounts that her pregnancy test happened to be positive.

== See also ==
- Jess No Limit
