= OVO (payment service) =

Digital payment service based in Jakarta, Indonesia

PT Visionet Internasional
- Logo variant until 2022
- Trade name: OVO
- Industry: Financial technology
- Founded: 25 September 2017; 8 years ago
- Founders: Lippo Group
- Headquarters: Jakarta, Indonesia
- Number of locations: Indonesia
- Key people: Jaygan Fu Ponnudurai, Karaniya Dharmasaputra
- Owner: Grab (90%), remainder local investors
- Website: www.ovo.id

OVO, officially a product of PT Visionet International, is a digital payment service based in Jakarta, Indonesia. It was established in 2017 with an e-money license from Bank Indonesia, and in 2019 was Indonesia's top digital payment service. Owned by Grab and local investors, in 2019, OVO became Indonesia's first finance-tech business unicorn.

== History ==
OVO was founded by Lippo Group and received permission to operate as a fintech company throughout Indonesia on 25 September 2017 with an e-money license for Bank Indonesia. OVO is a product of PT Visionet International, which is the digital financial services subsidiary of the Lippo Group. OVO debuted a digital wallet in September of 2017. In December 2017, it was announced that Tokyo Century Corporation had invested US$116 million for a 20% stake in the startup. OVO added new financial services in 2018 and Grab invested in the company.

In March 2019, Indonesian e-commerce company Tokopedia invested in OVO. That month, OVO's value was estimated at US$2.9 billion by CB Insights. In October 2019, the Minister of Communications and Information, Rudiantara announced that OVO had become the fifth official Indonesian unicorn after Gojek, Traveloka, Bukalapak and Tokopedia. OVO was also recognized as Indonesia's first finance-tech business unicorn. PT Visionet International shareholders appointed Karaniya Dharmasaputra as president director of the company in 2019, replacing Andrian Suherman, who had led OVO for three years. In 2021, Grab increased its stake in OVO to 79.5%, acquiring Tokopedia and Lippo Group's shares together with a number of local investors.

In October of 2021, Grab bought out Tokopedia and raised its stake in OVO to 90% in the process, also buying stakes from Lippo Group. Dyak NK Makhijani became President Commissioner at PT Visionet International in August of 2022, after Mirza Adityaswara left the OVO board of commissioners. At that time, 90% of OVO was owned by Grab. As a digital payment platform, in September 2023 it is reported that OVO will be available in 600 cities and districts in Indonesia with a total of 1.5 million users.

== Products and services ==
OVO's core business is digital payment based on its e-money license. According to a 2021 report by research company Kadence International, at the time OVO was the leading e-money / digital wallet in Indonesia for both online and offline transactions.

Also involved in financial services, OVO offers lending services through Taralite (PT Indonusa Nusa Sejahtera), a P2P lending company that it acquired in 2019, as well as investment products under OVO | Invest and insurance products under OVO | Proteksi in collaboration with partners.

OVO works with companies for these financial services products such as Adira Finance (a member of MUFJ Group), Bank BRI, Manulife Aset Manajemen Indonesia, and Prudential Indonesia.

== See also ==
- List of unicorn startup companies
- List of Indonesian inventions and discoveries
