= Tokopedia =

Indonesian e-commerce company

PT Tokopedia

- Tokopedia's headquarters at Ciputra World Jakarta
- Type: Subsidiary
- Industry: Internet
- Founded: 6 February 2009; 17 years ago
- Founder: William Tanuwijaya; Leontinus Alpha Edison
- Headquarters: Jakarta, Indonesia
- Area served: Indonesia
- Key people: William Tanuwijaya (Co-founder and CEO); Leontinus Alpha Edison (Co-founder and COO)
- Products: Electronic commerce
- Services: Online shopping; Financial services
- Number of employees: 4,700 (2019)
- Parent: ByteDance (via TikTok, 75%); GoTo (25%)
- Website: tokopedia.com

PT Tokopedia is an Indonesian e-commerce company. Tokopedia is a subsidiary of GoTo, following a merger with Gojek on 17 May 2021. It is one of the most visited e-commerce platforms in Indonesia.

Tokopedia is one of Indonesia's unicorn companies, alongside Bukalapak, Gojek, OVO, and Traveloka.

As of December 2020, Tokopedia claims to have more than 350 million product listings and 42 digital products, and serves over 100 million monthly active users as well as over 9.7 million merchants on its platform.

== History ==
William Tanuwijaya and Leontinus Alpha Edison came up with the idea for Tokopedia in 2007. While reflecting on his childhood experience, Tanuwijaya realized that access to products such as books differed between small towns and big cities, and that technology could provide better access to products. The duo launched Tokopedia two years later with starting capital from an acquaintance.

Toko is Indonesian for "shop", and is the first half of the portmanteau of the company's name, concatenated with "encyclopedia". The choice of this designation is to reflect their objective of becoming an all-encompassing marketplace for Indonesians. Tokopedia has since expanded its business to cover the fintech, payments, logistics, and retail sectors.

Since 2017, Tokopedia's office resides in a 53-floor building called the Tokopedia Tower, located in the central business district of Jakarta.

As of 2018, it is claimed that Tokopedia's products and services are accessible in 93% of sub-districts across Indonesia.

In March 2023, Tokopedia announced its new management structure with Melissa Siska Juminto appointed as President of E-Commerce for Tokopedia and Director/Chief Human Resources Officer for GoTo. Melissa was previously the COO of Tokopedia since 2018.

On December 11, 2023, TikTok, operating under ByteDance, officially announced the acquisition of 75% of Tokopedia's shares. This investment is valued at 1.5 billion US dollars, or around 23.4 trillion Indonesian Rupiah. This collaboration is a step for TikTok to expand its operations in the Indonesian e-commerce sector, particularly through the TikTok Shop platform. Although TikTok now holds a large portion of Tokopedia's shares, 25% of Tokopedia's shares are still held by GoTo, the corporate group that previously encompassed Tokopedia. This collaboration does not affect the shareholding of Tokopedia in PT GoTo Gojek Tokopedia Tbk (GoTo).

== Restructuring and layoffs ==
In June 2024, Tokopedia reportedly laid off 70 employees. This layoff was part of the company's efficiency strategy amid changes in the e-commerce industry.

== Finance ==
In 2009, Tokopedia received seed funding from PT Indonusa Dwitama of IDR 2.5 billion. Tokopedia later attracted capital injections from venture capitalists including East Ventures (in 2010), CyberAgent Ventures (in 2011), NetPrice (in 2012), and SoftBank Ventures Korea (in 2013).

In October 2014, Tokopedia became the first technology company in Southeast Asia to receive a US$100 million investment, led by Sequoia Capital and SoftBank Internet and Media Inc (SIMI).

In April 2016, Tokopedia raised another US$147 million. A year later, it received US$1.1 billion in a new round of investment, led by Chinese e-commerce giant Alibaba Group. In 2018, an additional US$1.1 billion was injected into the company, in a round led by existing investors Alibaba and SoftBank, raising the company's valuation to approximately US$7 billion.

In December 2023, Tokopedia got a $1.5 billion investment from ByteDance's social media platform, TikTok.

== Products and services ==
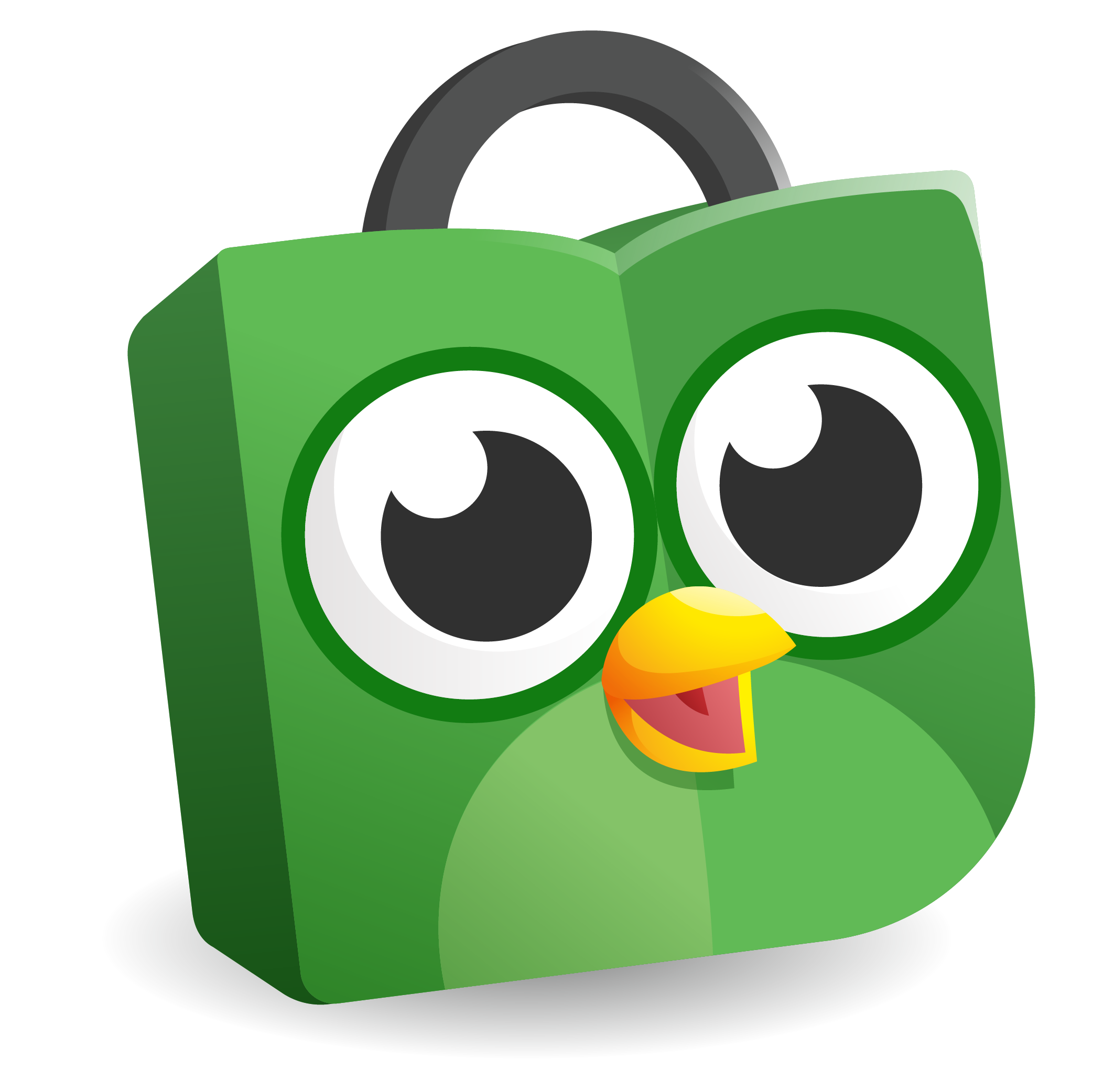
Tokopedia's official mascot, named "Toped".

Tokopedia provides a customer-to-customer (C2C) platform that is free to use for merchants and buyers. Brands operating on a business-to-customer (B2C) basis have the option to set up verified, official stores on the platform too. Products listed on Tokopedia vary widely across at least 25 categories, ranging from food and beverages to beauty and fashion products, and more.

Tokopedia also offers digital products such as credit, bill payments, voucher and ticket purchases, and others.

In 2018, Tokopedia launched Mitra Tokopedia to offer fintech solutions such as digital wallets (e-wallets), virtual credit cards, insurance, and more. Mitra is targeted at small business owners such as grocery stores and family-owned warungs.

In 2019, Tokopedia launched a smart fulfilment service called TokoCabang, which helps sellers to expand their business across Indonesia. Tokopedia Salam was launched not long after—a service that supports Sharia market needs in Indonesia by providing Umrah services. Users can also purchase a variety of Muslim-friendly products and services through Salam. Sharia-compliant payment methods and investment products are also available on Tokopedia's platform.

== Controversies ==
Tokopedia suffered a data breach on 2 May 2020, when the personal information of 15 million users were hacked, including their gender, locations, usernames, full names, email addresses, phone numbers, and hashed passwords. The hacker, under the pseudonym ShinyHunters, put up the entire database purported to have 91 million records for sale at a price of US$5,000.

Tokopedia emphasized that the crucial data of its users, such as passwords, will remain protected and encrypted, and data-related payment methods stored on the platform were not affected by the breach. To further investigate the matter, the company has said that they will work closely with key government institutions, including the Ministry of Communication and Informatics and the National Cyber and Crypto Agency (BSSN), as well as engage world-class, independent agencies specializing in cybersecurity to identify ways to enhance our protection of Tokopedia users.

Tokopedia has been listed as a "notorious market" since 2018 by the USTR for having high volumes of counterfeit and pirated product listings.

== See also ==
- List of unicorn startup companies
