= Rapp =

Rapp or RAPP may refer to:

- Rapp (surname)
- Rapp, West Virginia
- HNoMS Rapp, the name of several Norwegian navy ships
- Russian Association of Proletarian Writers
- Fort Rapp, a fort in France
- Rapp Motorenwerke, early 20th-century German aircraft engine manufacturer and predecessor to BMW
- Riau Andalan Pulp & Paper, company of Indonesia
