= 2013 Southeast Asian haze =

Smoke haze over the Southeast Asia region

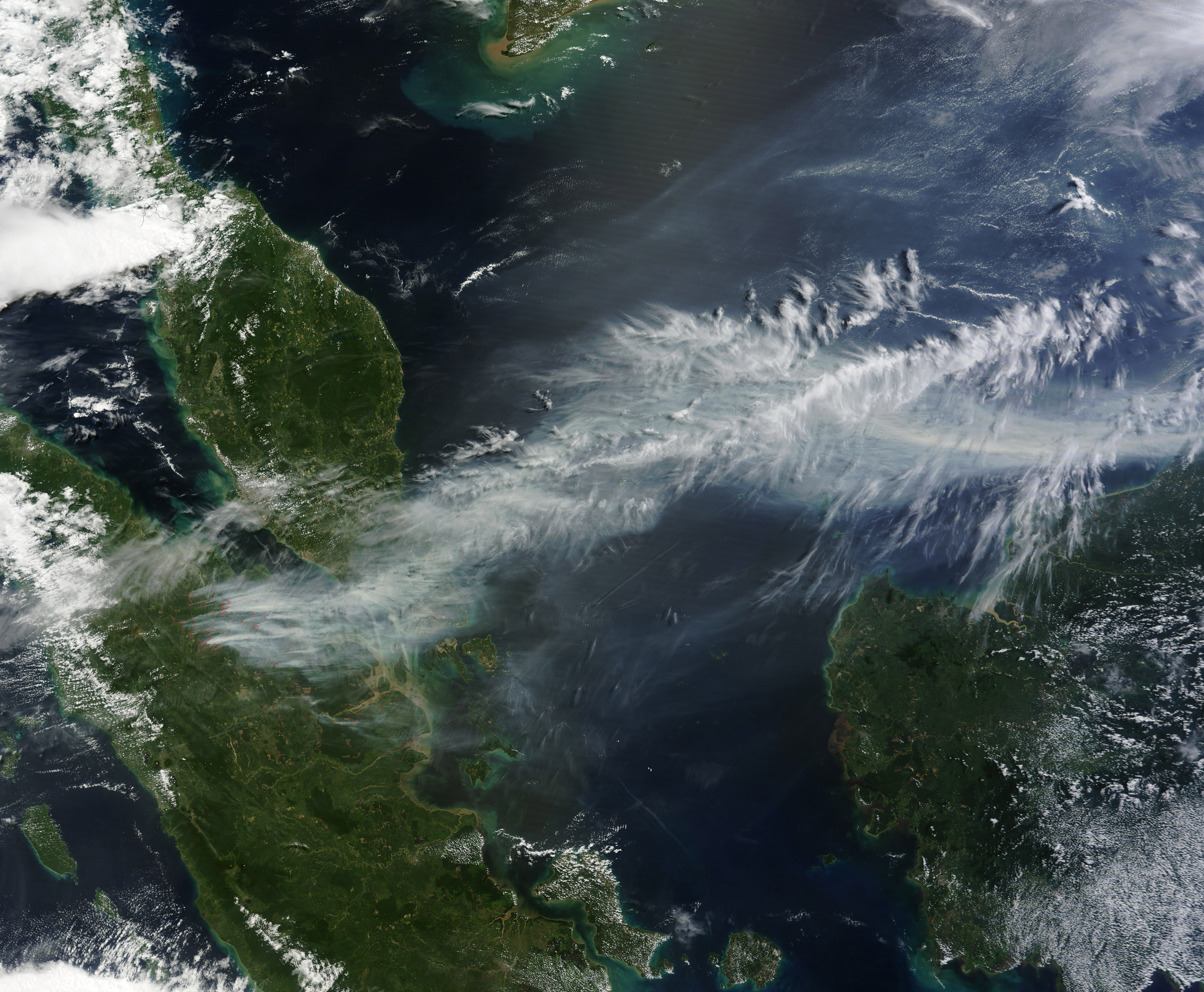
A NASA satellite image of the haze on 19 June 2013.

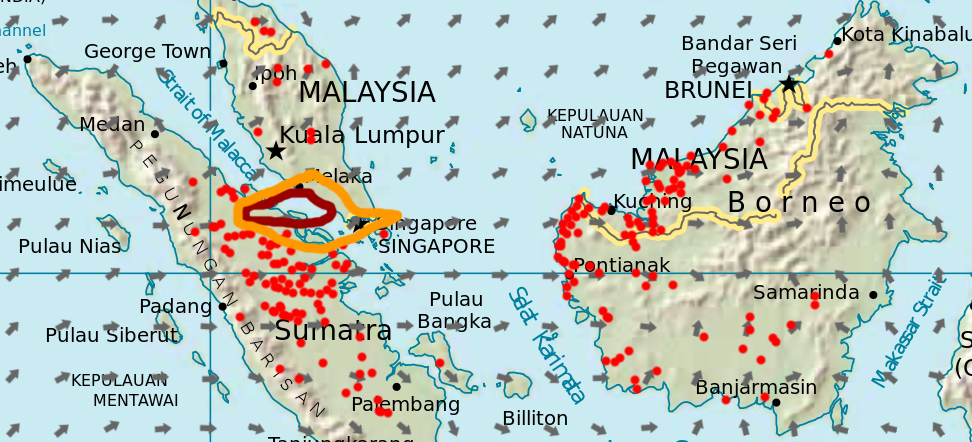
The extent of the haze as of 19 June 2013.

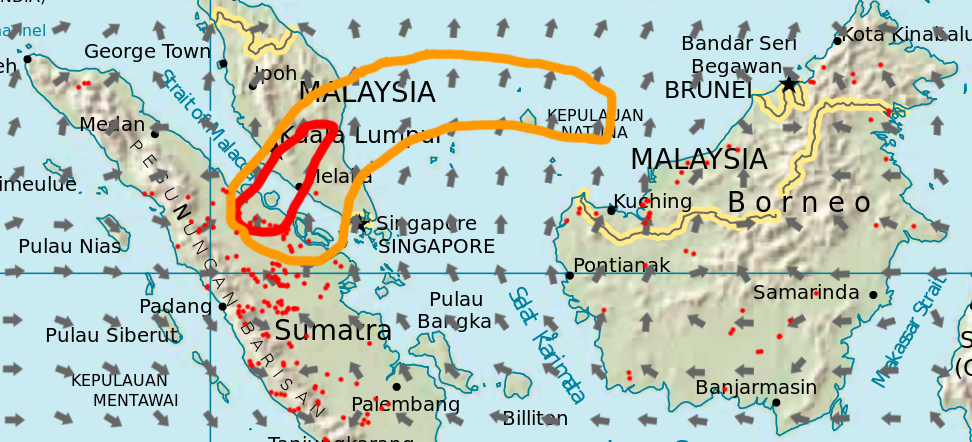
The extent of the haze as of 23 June 2013.

The 2013 Southeast Asian haze was a haze crisis that affected several countries in Southeast Asia, including Brunei, Indonesia, Malaysia, Singapore and Southern Thailand, mainly during June and July 2013. The haze period was caused by large-scale burning in many parts of Sumatra and Borneo. Satellite imagery from NASA's Terra and Aqua satellites showed that the haze was mainly due to smoke from fires burning in Riau province, Indonesia.

The 2013 Southeast Asian haze was notable for causing record high levels of pollution in Singapore and several parts of Malaysia. The 3-hour Pollution Standards Index in Singapore reached a record high of 401 on 21 June 2013, surpassing the previous record of 226 set during the 1997 Southeast Asian Haze. On 23 June, the Air Pollution Index (API) in Muar, Johor spiked to 746 at 7 am which was almost 2.5 times above the minimum range of the Hazardous level thus resulting in the declaration of emergency in Muar and Ledang (which was afterwards lifted on 15 June in the morning), leaving the towns in virtual shutdown.

== Chronology of events ==
On 19 of June 2013, NASA's Terra and Aqua satellites captured images of smoke from illegal wildfires on the Indonesian island of Sumatra blowing east toward southern Malaysia and Singapore, causing thick clouds of haze in the region. As stated by a local Indonesian official, the source of the haze might be a 3,000 hectare peatland in Bengkalis Regency, Riau Province, which was set ablaze by an unknown party on 9 June. As many as 187 hotspots were picked up by satellites on 18 June, down to 85 on 20 June.

On 21 June 2013, a total of 437 hotspots were detected in Sumatra. Two days later, the number was down to 119. On 24 June 159 hotspots were detected in Riau, out of a total of 227 detected in Sumatra. An air force officer explained that the low number of hotspots detected on some days was due to heavy cloud cover, which prevented the satellite from detecting some of the hotspots. The Malaysia Department of Environment said that 173 hotspots were detected in Malaysia on 24 June, with 1 in Negeri Sembilan, 1 in Terengganu, 3 in Sabah, and 168 in Sarawak. Many of the hotspots were owned by palm oil companies or smallholder farmers who supply palm oil to these companies and use slash-and-burn methods to clear their land for the next planting season. However, Singapore's Prime Minister, Lee Hsien Loong, said that the fires were most likely started by errant companies, instead of slash-and-burn by smallholders. On 25 June, Indonesia's president Susilo Bambang Yudhoyono issued a formal apology to Malaysia and Singapore for the hazardous smog.

On 26 June 2013, 265 hotspots were detected by satellites, but decreased to 54 on 27 June after heavy rain fell overnight between the two days. Newly promoted Premier League team Cardiff City also cancelled a week-long visit to Malaysia, the home of its billionaire owner, Vincent Tan, that was scheduled to begin that week, as a result of the severe haze.

The number of hotspots in Sumatra continued to decrease on 27 June, with 42 hotspots recorded at 4 pm. At the same time on 28 June, only 15 hotspots were detected by satellites. Singapore's National Environment Agency said that this could be the reason for the improving haze conditions in Singapore and Malaysia over the past week. The number of hotspots decreased further to just 7 on 29 June.

The World Wide Fund for Nature (WWF) renewed calls for the enaction and enforcement of zero-burn policies. Based on satellite detection of hotspots, the province of Riau in Sumatra was found to contain over 88% of the hotspots that caused the worst haze over Singapore and Peninsular Malaysia since 1997. From 1 to 24 June, NASA satellites have detected a total of more than 9,000 hotspots in Sumatra, and more than 8,000 of them were located in Riau.

By 29 June, a total of 2,800 military personnel, as well as helicopters and aircraft, were being deployed to fight the fires. About 3,000 civilians were also helping with the firefighting. The fires reduced from an area of 16,500ha to 4,081ha.

On 1 July, 4 hotspots were detected in Riau, the lowest number so far since the burning started.

On 19 July, 43 hotspots were detected in Sumatra.

The next day, the number of hotspots rose sharply as Sumatra was experiencing dry weather. There were 159 hotspots in Sumatra, with 63 of them located in Riau.

On 21 July, the number of hotspots in Sumatra spiked to reach 261 as a result of the continuing dry weather. 173 hotspots were detected in Riau. The remaining hotspots were mainly located in the north of the island, in Aceh and North Sumatra. In Malaysia, a total of 19 hotspots were detected. There were 7 hotspots in Johor, 4 each in Kelantan and Pahang, 2 in Perak, and 1 each in Selangor and Sabah.

The hotspots decreased slightly a day later. 167 hotspots were detected in Riau, out of a total of 252 in Sumatra.

However, the number of hotspots in Riau climbed to 183 on 23 July, the highest number of hotspots detected in Riau since the haze returned.

On 24 July, satellites detected 185 hotspots in Riau. Indonesian authorities said that the number of hotspots is expected to rise in August, when slashing-and-burning activity is very likely to peak, thus causing the haze to possibly thicken and increase.

On 25 July, the number of hotspots in Riau decreased to 56, after 4 helicopters and 100 military personnel helped to fight the fires.

There was a sharp increase in the hotspots in Indonesia on 26 August 2013, with 488 hotspots detected. There were 308 hotspots the day after, on 27 August 2013.

== Countries affected ==
=== Brunei ===
On 23 June, the Asean Specialised Meteorological Centre (ASMC) in Singapore detected 642 hotspots, which were scattered mostly in parts of central and west Borneo that caused a haze in Brunei and other parts of Borneo. On 20 June, Brunei-Muara District recorded a "good" PSI reading of 44, Belait recorded a "moderate" 75, Temburong recorded a "moderate" 64, and Tutong recorded a "moderate" 66. By 21 June, The Department of Environment, Parks and Recreation of Brunei said the PSI readings were "relatively higher than normal", but air pollution levels were still considered "moderate" as the PSI readings in Brunei were still below 100. Belait recorded the highest PSI reading (98), followed by Temburong (94), Tutong (92), and Brunei-Muara (65), which was the lowest. On 24 June, haze in Brunei remained unchanged with PSI readings in Brunei-Muara at a good 43, Belait at a moderate 75, Temburong at a moderate 72 and Tutong at a moderate 73. On 26 June, the haze was gone from Brunei and PSI levels returned to "good" levels. However, "moderate" levels were still recorded on Tutong (70) and Belait (64). The total number of hotspots also declined from the 231 reported on Saturday to 117 on Tuesday.

==== Measures taken ====
During the haze period, the Brunei Ministry of Health released a health advisory to the public. The public was also advised to regularly check the PSI (Pollutant Standard Index), follow the health advisory and seek treatment if they felt unwell because of haze.

==== Pollutant Standard Index readings ====
Pollutant Standard Index readings for Brunei Darussalam

Date (Time)	Brunei-Muara	Belait	Temburong	Tutong
26 (4 pm)	45	48	42	54
27 (12 pm)	26	41	37	50
27 (4 pm)	38	52	46	45
27 (5 pm)	46	41	62	62
28 (9 am)	36	43	24	32
0–50 Good 51–100 Moderate 101–200 Unhealthy

=== Indonesia ===
In Pekanbaru, capital of Riau province, where the majority of hotspots were located, visibility dropped and a number of Pekanbaru residents complained that the haze was affecting their health, and Sultan Syarif Kasim II Airport had to be closed for several hours, causing several flights to be diverted to nearby airports such as Polonia International Airport, Medan or to Kuala Lumpur, Malaysia. Flights to and from Pinang Kampai Airport of Dumai were also suspended by the authorities because of poor visibility.

While much of the press focused on the haze's impact in Singapore and Malaysia, the local residents of Riau were also affected. Residents fled their homes in Bengkalis, with about 30% experiencing respiratory problems. The fires burned through hectares of local farmland, decimating the season's crops. The PSI in Dumai hit 492 on the morning of 21 June 2013. However, because of the wind patterns, most parts of Indonesia were not hit by the haze.

Earlier on 22 June, Indonesian government blamed eight companies, including Jakarta-based PT Sinar Mas Agro Resources and Technology (SMART) and Asia Pacific Resources International (APRIL), for the fires. Later on 22 June, Environment Minister Balthasar Kambuaya revealed that at least 20 plantation companies operating in Riau were suspected to have caused land and forest fires, of which 8 were Malaysian: PT Langgam Inti Hiberida, PT Bumi Rakksa Sejati, PT Tunggal Mitra Plantation, PT Udaya Loh Dinawi, PT Adei Plantation, PT Jatim Jaya Perkasa, PT Multi Gambut Industri and PT Mustika Agro Lestari. However, following a meeting in Indonesia between Balthasar and Palanivel, only four of the companies were from Malaysia and the companies had denied any involvement in the fires. Other local companies detected were PT Siak Seraya, PT Kimia Tirta Utama, PT Inti Indo Sawit Subur, Village Unit Cooperatives (KUD) Dayus Mas, PT Padasa Enam Utama, PT Kartayatam Bhakti Mulia, PT Langgam Inti Hibrindo, PT Riau Sakti Trans, PT Raja Garuda Masa Sejati, PT Sabira Negeri Utama, PT Guntung Hasrat Makmur, PT Panca Surya Agrindo, PT Bumi Reksa Nusa Sejati, PT Surya Bratasena Plantation, PT Adei Crumb Rubber, PT Rokan Adi Raya, Cooperatives 13 Anak Suku Bonai, PT Karyatama Bhakti Muli and PT Agroraya Gematrans.

On the morning of 24 June, the haze shrouded Pekanbaru, the provincial capital of Riau. The PSI in Pekanbaru had been hovering around the moderate reading of 100 the previous week, but it rose to an unhealthy reading of 140 on the night of 23 June 2013. The same morning, several commercial flights at Syarif Kasim II Airport were delayed before takeoff by poor visibility caused by the haze. In Dumai, one of the worst-affected regencies in Riau, visibility was reduced to less than 500m after the PSI hit a hazardous record of 900. This was the highest in any haze crisis and three times above the minimum "Hazardous" level.

On 25 June, eight Indonesian farmers were arrested for creating fires that set in motion the blazes. The number increased to 23 on 1 July, after another six farmers were arrested for carrying out illegal slash-and-burn activities.

Indonesia said that it would ratify the 2002 ASEAN Agreement on Transboundary Haze Pollution as soon as possible. Indonesia's Environment Minister, Balthasar Kambuaya, emphasised the importance of ratifying the agreement, saying that Indonesia should be concerned about the impact of the haze on its own people, and also the well-being of people in neighbouring countries affected by the haze. As of 6 July 2013, Indonesia had yet to ratify the pact.

On 21 July, thick haze blanketed Dumai again because of the sudden increase in the number of hotspots, with visibility at street level dropping to below 200m.

On 22 July, many parts of Riau recorded hazardous PSI readings. The worst reading, 619, was recorded in Rumbai, north of Pekanbaru, the provincial capital of Riau. Since then, the air quality in Riau has been worsening. Flights to and from Pekanbaru were delayed because of the deteriorating visibility.

==== Measures taken ====
The Indonesian government used weather-changing technology to create artificial rain and extinguish raging fires. It earmarked around 200 billion rupiah (around US$20M, S$25.6M at the time) to handle the disaster and deployed seven military aircraft for water bombings and cloud-seeding to fight raging forest fires on 21 June 2013.

In June alone, more than 3000 soldiers, marines and air force officers were deployed to help fight the fires.

The Agriculture Minister Suswono stated that an investigation has been launched to find the firms responsible for the air pollution, and agreed to publish the names of the firms if they were proven guilty.

Forestry Minister Zulkifli Hasan said the government would not tolerate companies burning land and bushes that caused the haze shrouding Riau and its surroundings. Companies which are proved to have used slash-and-burn to clear land would be acted upon firmly. The government assigned the National Police to handle the legal process and make sanctions against firms behind forest fires.

At dawn on 23 June, rain fell for 30 minutes in Dumai, the coastal city nearest to many of the hotspots, as a result of cloud-seeding. Rain fell on Dumai again at 5 pm on the same day, after a Hercules C-130 jet commenced cloud-seeding in the Bengkalis district as well as Dumai at 2 pm. However, not much rain fell. First Lieutenant Fajar Gusthana, one of those who did the cloud-seeding, said that it was difficult as there were very few clouds, and the clouds were generally quite thin. He also said that there were no clouds directly above the hotspots, which made it harder for them to carry out the cloud-seeding.

On 27 June, Indonesia said that it would start larger scale water-bombing in one week. Indonesia planned to do this with the help of rented Russian Kamov helicopters with belly tanks that could carry 8,000 litres of water, compared with Indonesian helicopters carrying 500 litres.

Indonesia switched into preventive mode on 1 July, after it had successfully put out most of the fires, although fires were still raging underground in the peatland. To enable itself to respond faster and extinguish the fires before they got out of control again, Indonesia increased night patrols. Water-bombing and cloud-seeding aircraft were placed on standby. Indonesia has said that the standby aircraft should be able to respond quickly to the fires and fly out immediately to Jambi, South Sumatra, and Lampung in Sumatra, as well as four provinces in Kalimantan on Borneo. Indonesia's National Disaster Management Agency spokesman Dr Agus Wibowo said that Indonesia expects fires to affect seven other provinces as well, as the dry season was not at its peak yet and was expected to continue until October.

As of 21 July, there were four helicopters and an aeroplane on standby in Riau, so that fires could be put out using cloud seeding and water bombing. A statement from Indonesia's disaster management agency on 22 July said that there were a total of 6 aeroplanes on standby for cloud seeding, while soldiers were also placed on standby to help fight any fires that occurred.

Indonesia began cloud-seeding and water bombing over Riau on 22 July, to reduce the number of hotspots which had risen sharply over the prior weekend and caused the haze to return to Malaysia. More than 370 firefighters were deployed to fight the fires, with 3 helicopters used for water bombing. In Pekanbaru, the provincial capital of Riau, there were more than 22 water-bombing operations carried out. However, there was only one cloud-seeding operation conducted, as there were insufficient clouds over Pekanbaru to make rain.

Willem Rampangilei, a deputy minister at the Coordinating Ministry for People's Welfare, said that the provincial government had already tried its best to fight the fires, but the number of hotspots remained about the same. He also said that following the failure to decrease the number of hotspots significantly, Jakarta would send more troops to fight the fires.

On 24 July, planes conducted cloud seeding operations, to reduce the haze which had shrouded Riau and the Straits of Malacca for the past few days.

On 8 January 2014, the Meulaboh district court on Sumatra island ruled that Indonesian company Kallista Alam had illegally burnt vegetation on 1,000 hectares (2,500 acres) of peatland in Aceh province to clear it for a palm oil plantation. In the civil case brought by the Ministry of Environment, the court ordered the company to pay 114.3 billion rupiah (S$9.4 million) in losses to the state and 252 billion rupiah to rehabilitate the land it destroyed.

=== Malaysia ===
==== Peninsular Malaysia ====
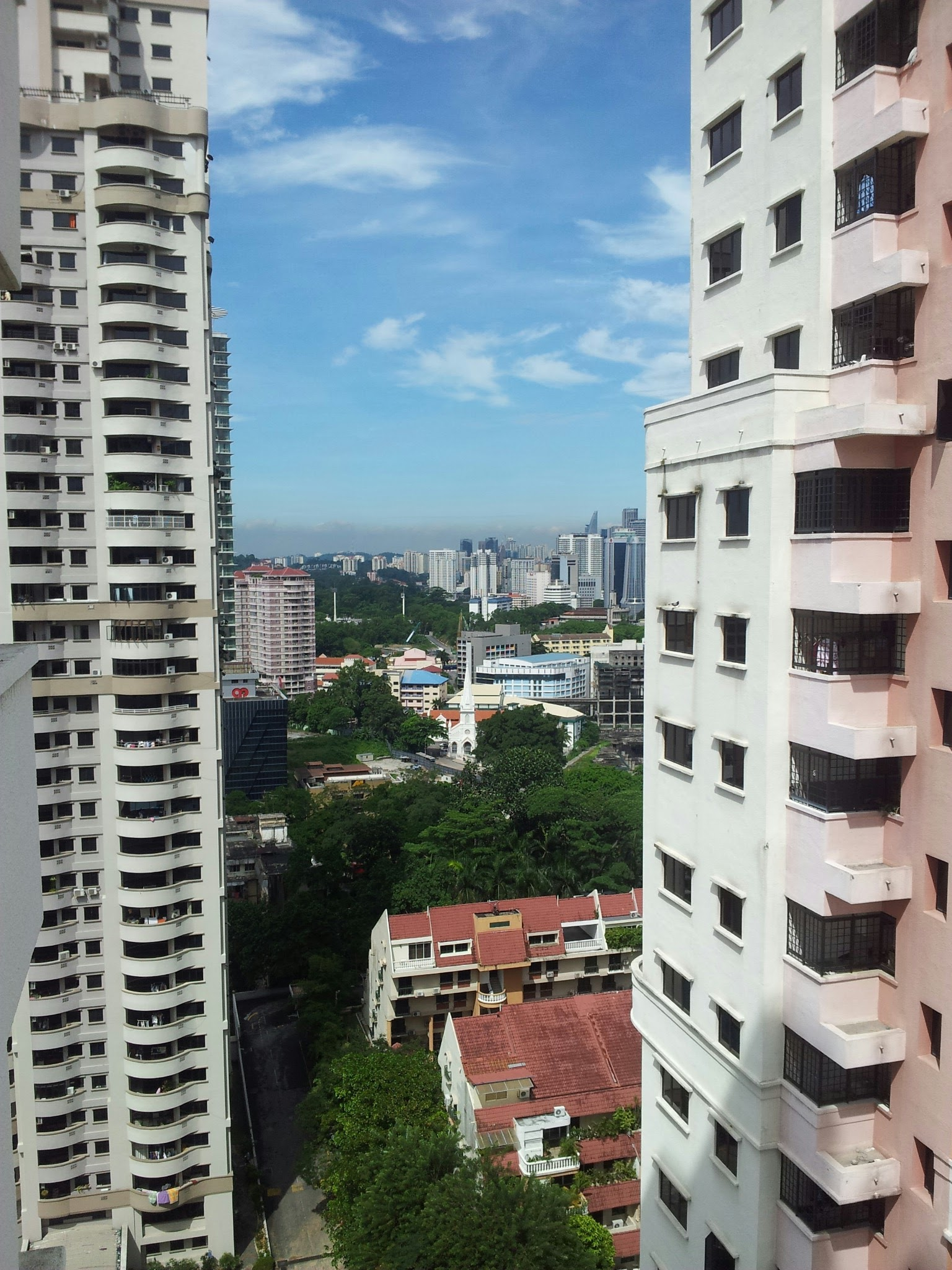
Centre of Kuala Lumpur looking south on 9 May 2013.

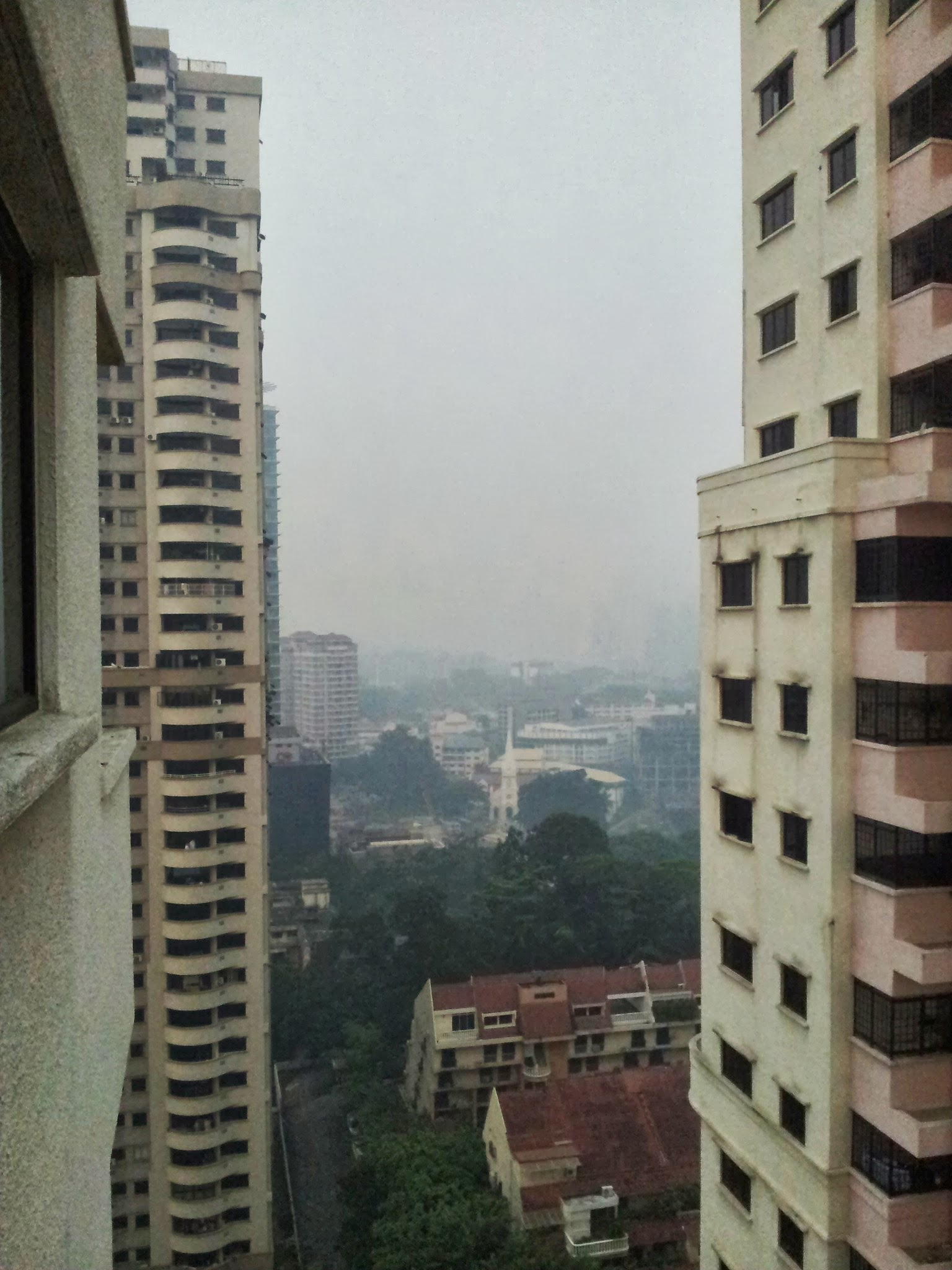
Centre of Kuala Lumpur looking south on 23 June 2013.

The haze that affected Malaysia was the worst since 2005, starting with the Air Pollution Index (API) hitting 172 on 19 June. On 17 June, there were only two areas recording unhealthy API values, a reduction from six areas on 16 June. According to the Malaysian Department of Environment, the two areas were Kemaman, Terengganu (118) and Balok Baru, Kuantan, Pahang (110). On 19 June, API readings at 5 pm. by the Malaysian Department of Environment showed that Johor and Malacca were the two states worst affected by the haze. The highest reading in Johor was 172, recorded in Muar, while that of Malacca was 161, recorded in the state capital, Malacca City.

On 20 June, the haze in Malaysia worsened. Johor and Malacca remained the worst-affected states. In Johor, Muar recorded a hazardous reading (383) at 11 am, which was one of the worst among the readings. Kota Tinggi was the second worst, hitting a Very unhealthy reading of 232. In Malacca, an API reading of 137 was recorded in Malacca City exceeding the Unhealthy API. Readings in other parts of Malaysia ranged from Good to Unhealthy.

A day later, the Malaysian Meteorological Department predicted that the haze would not dissipate until 26 June, when Tropical Storm Bebinca was expected to be blown from the southwest, bringing strong winds and dry weather to carry the smog from Sumatra over to West Malaysia. The Johor State Health Department reported the number of citizens with upper respiratory tract ailments increased by at least 21%.

On 23 June, the Air Pollution Index (API) in Muar, Johor spiked to 746 at 7 am which was almost 2.5 times the lower end of the Hazardous level thus resulting in the declaration of a state of emergency in Muar and Ledang (which was afterwards lifted on 25 June in the morning), leaving the towns in virtual shutdown. It was also almost 450 more than the minimum range of the Hazardous level.

On 24 June, shifting winds blew the haze northwards away from Johor and Singapore, towards Malacca, Selangor, Negeri Sembilan, Perak and Penang. The haze also blanketed the east coast, especially the states of Pahang, Terengganu, and Kelantan. Air quality in central and northern Peninsula Malaysia was also worsening. Kuala Lumpur recorded an Unhealthy API of 198 at 11 am indicating the first reading in KL to be on the cusp of entering the Very unhealthy range in the haze season. Port Dickson was the worst hit by the haze, with the API entering the Hazardous range with a reading of 335 at 7 am, although the figure decreased to a Very unhealthy reading of 292 at 11 am

Even though the haze had cleared off a bit in the southern parts of the nation, Port Klang recorded a Very unhealthy series of API values which reached the Hazardous range with a reading of 487 in the morning of 25 June. The drifting smoke from the south also caused other places in Selangor and Kuala Lumpur to be blanketed by thick smog, resulting in the API coming very close to entering the Hazardous level. Seri Manjung in Perak which is 200 km away from Port Klang was also hit hard by the haze. Visibility remained poor in Kuala Lumpur and several other states.

Malaysians were able to breathe easier when the overnight rain in numerous parts of the west coast helped to clear the skies. There was a significant drop in the API values in most areas, including Port Klang since 26 June.

The haze crisis is believed to have claimed its first life, a diabetic woman from Muar who was suffering from asthma. Another casualty was an elderly man, also from the same town. Both deaths were reported early in the week.

On 29 June, the improvement in API readings continued, with the PSI readings hovering in the Good and Moderate ranges. At 5 pm, the worst PSI readings were in the Moderate range, recorded in Kota Tinggi and Bukit Rambai, at 81 and 86 respectively.

On 21 July, the haze blanketed certain states of Malaysia yet again. Some parts of Selangor, Negeri Sembilan, and Malacca were hit with API readings in the higher part of the Moderate range. Bukit Rambai, in the state of Malacca, was worst hit. At 12 am, a moderate API reading of 94 was recorded. The reading then continued to escalate, hitting right at the very end of the Moderate range (100) at 7 am, and entered the Unhealthy range an hour later. The air quality in Bukit Rambai continued to worsen, and the highest API value of the day, 118, was recorded at 8 pm and 9 pm. It began to subside at 10 pm.

On 22 July, the haze conditions in Selangor, Malacca and Negeri Sembilan worsened. Johor also got hit by the haze. Bukit Rambai remained the worst hit of all, with an unhealthy API of 135, the worst since the haze returned, recorded there. Muar, Malacca City, Banting, and Kuala Lumpur also recorded unhealthy readings.

On 23 July, the haze conditions changed again. At 8 am, API readings in Port Klang was 105, 116 in Bukit Rambai and 115 in Muar.

Visibility at several Malaysian airports was reduced by the haze, which travelled northwards to the northern states of Terengganu, Kelantan and Penang. In Terengganu, visibility at the Sultan Mahmud Airport in Kuala Terengganu was reduced to 3 km in the evening, while visibility at Kerteh Airport was reduced to 6 km. In Penang, the Penang International Airport in Bayan Lepas also had visibility reduced to 6 km. However, in Kelantan, visibility at the Sultan Ismail Petra Airport in Kota Baru was at a safe 10 km. Petaling Jaya and Subang, both in Selangor, were also hit by poor visibility at around noon, but it gradually improved to reach 6 km and 9 km respectively.

The haze was expected to ease over Johor, Pahang, Klang Valley, Muar, Malacca City and Manjung on 25 July, where rain was expected. However, Kuala Lumpur, Petaling Jaya, Kuala Selangor, Putrajaya, Port Dickson would remain dry.

On 24 July, Ipoh, Tanjung Malim, and Perai recorded unhealthy API levels in the afternoon, at 106 (4 pm), 101 (5 pm) and 102 (1 pm and 2 pm) respectively. API readings for the day were mostly moderate in Malaysia, although a few areas recorded good readings.

On 25 July, the haze continued to be blown towards the northern parts of Malaysia. Air quality in most parts of Malaysia were in the Moderate range for the day. The worst hit areas were Ipoh, the state capital of Perak, and Seberang Jaya, in Penang, where unhealthy API levels were recorded in the afternoon. The highest API reading of the day, 106, was recorded in Ipoh at 4 pm.

On 26 July, Bukit Rambai (Malacca), Seri Manjung (Perak), Port Klang (Selangor) and Perai (Penang) were worst affected, with the highest API readings at 82 (11 pm), 87 (12 am), 84 (12 am) and 87 (12 am).

On 27 July, air quality in many parts of Malaysia returned to the Good range, although some remained in the Moderate range. From 12 am to 5 am, most of the API readings were in the lower part of the Moderate range. However, Bukit Rambai, Seri Manjung, Port Klang and Ipoh remained the worst affected areas, with a highest API reading of 83 (multiple times in the morning), 79 (2 am and 3 am) and 78 (2 am and 3 am) respectively. Ipoh's API almost entered the Unhealthy range, recording the worst reading of the day, 99, at 3 pm. This was only one point away from the "Unhealthy" range, in which even the slightest increase could result in the entering of the "Unhealthy" range.

On 28 July, air quality remained in the Moderate range in many parts of Malaysia during the day, although most areas recorded good readings in the early morning. Bukit Rambai's air quality remained in the Moderate range for the whole day. Its worst reading was 82, recorded at 10 pm and 11 pm. In Negeri Sembilan, Seremban was worst-affected, recording a moderate 84 at 4 pm. Ipoh's worst reading was a moderate 92, also at 4 pm. Selangor, which included the capital state of Wilayah Persekutuan, was worst-hit. Petaling Jaya, Putrajaya, and the Cheras area of Kuala Lumpur all recorded unhealthy API levels. Cheras was worst affected, with air quality remaining unhealthy from 2 pm to 6 pm. Its highest reading, 139, was recorded at 5 pm, the worst reading of the day in Malaysia. Petaling Jaya's air quality was unhealthy from 3 to 4 pm, recording 105 at 3 pm. Putrajaya only breached the 100 mark for an hour, recording 101 at 5 pm.

On 29 July, Bukit Rambai, Seremban, Banting, Port Klang, Kuala Lumpur, Petaling Jaya and Shah Alam were worst hit. Excluding KL, their worst readings were 84 (11 pm), 95 (4 pm), 82 (10 pm), 92 (11 pm), 81 (10–11 pm) and 80 (11 pm). The Batu Muda area of KL recorded its worst reading of 83 from 2 pm to 6 pm. The Cheras area of KL recorded readings in the lower part of the Moderate range for most part of the day, but was the only place to breach the Unhealthy range, when an API reading of 102 was recorded at 1 pm.

On 30 July, Bukit Rambai was worst affected, with the API constantly remaining in the 80s. Its worst reading was 85, recorded at 12 am. Tanjung Malim recorded 81 at 3 pm, after a sudden spike from a good 48 the previous hour, although it dropped to 52 at 4 pm. Port Klang recorded the worst reading of the day, 92, at 12 am. However, air quality in the other badly affected areas of the previous day improved.

On 31 July, Bukit Rambai remained the worst affected area. API readings there hovered in the 80s, although occasionally dropping to the upper 70s, like the past few days. The highest reading was 84, at 10 am. That was also the highest reading for the day in Malaysia. Port Klang's API readings rose from the 50s in the early morning to 77 (5–9 pm). For most of the day, it was in the 70s. API readings in some other areas like Kemaman in Terrenganu, Banting, Malacca City and Muar were in the 60s for most of the day. Tanjung Malim's air quality was good for most of the day, but spiked suddenly to reach 72 at 3 pm, and 75 an hour later. It gradually decreased and returned to the Good range at 8 pm.

On 1 August, Bukit Rambai remained the worst-affected. API readings there dropped gradually during the morning, reaching 68 at 11 am, the lowest recorded there for many days already. However, it then increased quickly for the rest of the day, breaching the 80 mark at 3 pm. At 4 pm, API was 90. As of 10 pm, the API was 92. The highest API for the day in Bukit Rambai was 93, recorded at 9 pm. That was also the highest reading of the day in Malaysia. Port Dickson's air quality remained between 52 and 70 for most of the day. However, it suddenly increased to 78 at 3 pm and 83 at 4 pm, before dropping an hour later. In Kuala Lumpur, air quality was mainly in the 50s. But in the Cheras area of KL, API readings soared to 71 at 2 pm, then to 86 at 3 pm, 77 at 4 pm, before returning to the 50s. In Seremban, air quality hovered around 60 for most of the day, although at 3 pm, a reading of 80 was recorded.

On 2 August, the haze still hit Bukit Rambai the hardest. In the early morning, the API readings continued rising up the 90s, hitting 100 at 5 am. That meant it was at the top of the "Moderate" range and even if it were to increase by only 1, that's it and it would enter the "Unhealthy" range. At 6 am, the API reading entered the Unhealthy range, hovering between 101 and 105. The highest reading, 105, was recorded at noon. At 3 pm, the air quality was back in the Moderate range, and subsided gradually. At 9 pm, it was 84. However, instead of Bukit Rambai, it was Tanjung Malim which recorded the worst reading of the day, 114, at 5 pm. That was also the highest in Malaysia. Like the past few days, Tanjung Malim's air quality was Good for most of the day, only spiking for a few hours each day. The air quality there entered the Moderate range at 2pm, and returned to the Good range at 8 pm. Other than the above two locations, Kemaman, Port Dickson, Seremban, Nilai and Malacca City also recorded air quality in the 70s for a few hours.

==== Malaysian Borneo ====
On 20 June, the API index in Sabah was moderate, with Kota Kinabalu at 74, Keningau, 66 and Sandakan, 42. On 22 June, the hazy condition in Sabah and Labuan became worse when the index in several areas had risen. Keningau registered a reading of 98 at 11 am, while Kota Kinabalu with 91 and Labuan 97. Until 25 June, only Sandakan and Tawau enjoyed cleaner air than other areas, with API readings at 50 and 42 respectively.

In Sarawak, the API entered the moderate range on 20 June, with readings of 72 in Miri and 55 in Kapit and Sri Aman. In addition, sixteen hot spots were detected on 18 June with Mukah having the most with five and Sarikei, three. Big plantation companies had been accused of being the major cause of haze in the state.

==== Measures taken ====
The organisers of the Olympic Day Run, McDonald's Malaysia and Olympic Council of Malaysia announced on 20 June the postponement of the 10th annual Run scheduled for 23 June amid health fears.

As of 23 June, more than 600 schools closed in areas of Johor where the Air Pollution Index (API) readings had exceeded the hazardous point of 300. Schools in areas with the API reaching 150 were advised to avoid outdoor activities. While the 2013 Johor Rugby Carnival had to be deferred until further notice, a directive was given to cancel all outdoor activities in the Malaysian National Service (PLKN) training camps in affected areas with Unhealthy API readings.

The Department of Environment issued a ban against open burning in Selangor, Malacca and Johor; those convicted would face fines of not more than RM500,000 (S$199,400), a maximum imprisonment of five years, or both according to Section 29AA(2) of the Environmental Quality (Amendment) Act 2001.

Malaysia's Prime Minister Najib Razak advised the public to reduce outdoor activities while the haze was still present. On 23 June, he declared a state of emergency in two southern districts, Muar and Ledang after the API values increased badly. The emergency status was later lifted on 25 June, Tuesday morning.

On 23 June, Malaysia's Natural Resources and Environment Minister, Datuk Seri G. Palanivel pronounced the closure of all schools in Kuala Lumpur, Selangor and Malacca on 24 June as a precautionary step. A total of 480 government-run kindergartens in Malacca were told to stop classes. Operators of private kindergartens and pre-schools were urged to follow suit by the state government of Malacca. Schools in Port Dickson and Kuantan were shut down as ordered by the respective state governments. In Johor Bahru, a number of schools remained temporarily closed while 300 schools in other parts of Johor were allowed to operate again as usual.

The next day, Pizza Hut Malaysia also temporarily halted delivery services for their Muar and Port Klang branches to ensure the riders' safety because of the worsening haze. They resumed delivery services in Muar a day later.

On 25 June, Malaysia's Education Minister, Muhyiddin Yassin said that parents had the discretion not to send their children to school in fear of health problems as long as they informed the relevant school authorities, as schools in some states were starting to reopen. The Department of Environment (DOE) began updating the API readings on an hourly basis. They were made available for public access on both the department's official website and portal.

The haze forced the opening ceremony of the 13th Parliament session in Kuala Lumpur to be held indoors for the first time in Malaysian history. Yang di-Pertuan Agong Tuanku Abdul Halim Mu'adzam Shah did the customary inspection of the guard-of-honour at the banquet hall of the Parliament building.

G. Palanivel was scheduled to meet his Indonesian counterpart to discuss the situation while Malaysian and Singaporean officials sought to move forward a meeting of the Association of Southeast Asian Nations (ASEAN) haze committee to the following week instead of August.

The Premier League newcomers, Cardiff City F.C. also postponed their six-day promotional tour of Malaysia in the week because of the air pollution crisis. Concurrently, all orders to shut schools in the nation were withdrawn by 27 June, though outdoor activities were to remain cancelled in some parts of the country.

On 28 June, the Shell Eco-marathon that was planned to be held in Kuala Lumpur on 4–7 July was cancelled because of worsening air quality.

Upon the return of the haze in mid-July, the Penang state government prepared 200,000 face masks to be distributed to the people, especially school children, pregnant women, motorcyclists and pillion riders.

==== Air Pollution Index readings ====
24-hour API readings in some areas in June 2013

Date (Time)	George Town	Seremban	Kuala Lumpur (Cheras)	Kuala Terengganu	Malacca City	Johor Bahru	Kuantan (Indera Mahkota)	Kuching	Kota Kinabalu	Port Klang	Muar	Seri Manjung
13 (7 am)	46	57	52	49	58	64	47	42	29	—N/a	50	49
13 (11 am)	50	—N/a	54	51	62	65	50	43	30	—N/a	67	52
13 (5 pm)	50	63	54	52	66	65	53	48	32	—N/a	80	57
14 (7 am)	38	—N/a	55	52	67	61	56	45	35	68	77	52
14 (11 am)	38	67	55	50	68	—N/a	57	45	33	66	65	51
14 (5 pm)	42	69	59	49	73	70	58	48	36	70	65	49
15 (7 am)	54	67	62	55	95	90	63	54	36	76	108	65
15 (11 am)	56	70	64	58	101	92	67	58	40	78	127	69
15 (5 pm)	57	77	71	60	104	93	76	62	40	81	148	72
16 (7 am)	64	87	82	76	112	81	86	76	50	102	125	77
16 (11 am)	64	96	86	78	129	79	85	66	49	104	110	77
16 (5 pm)	64	96	86	81	161	80	89	63	49	103	86	81
17 (7 am)	56	84	74	70	129	77	106	59	52	73	71	71
17 (11 am)	53	69	66	70	102	74	107	58	55	67	65	67
17 (5 pm)	46	65	60	72	62	77	99	56	60	63	62	56
18 (7 am)	41	60	59	84	65	116	70	47	61	80	65	39
18 (11 am)	46	61	62	84	68	125	67	42	60	85	70	42
18 (5 pm)	49	68	65	84	72	122	63	46	59	85	68	52
19 (7 am)	55	82	75	77	148	122	67	60	56	96	133	70
19 (11 am)	56	84	76	77	160	124	68	65	56	98	157	71
19 (5 pm)	57	80	72	75	161	152	70	68	56	96	172	70
20 (7 am)	54	76	61	66	134	171	72	79	67	70	337	64
20 (11 am)	53	78	61	66	137	181	71	80	74	65	383	65
20 (5 pm)	52	86	67	65	150	219	73	85	79	70	—N/a	68
21 (7 am)	57	105	78	57	192	190	85	84	—N/a	91	183	80
21 (11 am)	60	109	81	54	205	197	87	83	—N/a	94	193	81
21 (5 pm)	64	119	80	51	271	158	90	86	—N/a	94	273	84
22 (7 am)	69	106	77	57	176	175	78	87	90	118	276	86
22 (11 am)	70	109	82	60	178	170	78	88	91	139	373	87
22 (5 pm)	72	108	92	66	188	167	80	88	89	145	—N/a	87
23 (7 am)	71	103	102	68	357	117	100	84	87	188	746	94
23 (11 am)	71	104	111	72	415	100	107	83	85	192	690	94
23 (5 pm)	71	103	134	83	373	89	138	77	83	214	507	106
24 (7 am)	70	153	157	95	182	111	171	70	76	296	148	141
24 (11 am)	71	169	160	98	141	107	166	72	75	288	132	148
24 (5 pm)	81	171	168	100	128	108	138	75	73	319	125	171
25 (7 am)	121	165	186	101	135	82	87	80	70	487	165	288
25 (11 am)	118	144	174	98	131	81	83	74	71	484	132	333
25 (5 pm)	106	141	147	89	121	75	77	68	71	464	127	290
26 (7 am)	62	118	98	85	93	66	65	51	67	140	70	137
26 (11 am)	60	118	86	82	91	65	62	53	65	117	67	110
26 (5 pm)	53	100	74	77	101	60	57	52	61	93	64	82
27 (7 am)	46	86	75	64	96	62	60	51	53	73	78	46
27 (11 am)	44	80	75	61	89	63	62	51	52	69	76	42
27 (5 pm)	45	77	67	56	76	73	63	52	—N/a	64	69	42
28 (7 am)	46	61	52	54	55	60	60	51	48	54	46	50
28 (11 am)	49	57	49	53	55	60	58	50	46	54	48	50
28 (5 pm)	50	61	84	55	60	56	57	50	44	56	47	51
0–50 Good 51–100 Moderate 101–200 Unhealthy 201–300 Very unhealthy >301 Hazardous

24-hour API readings in some areas in July 2013

Date (Time)	George Town	Seremban	Kuala Lumpur (Cheras)	Kuala Terengganu	Malacca City	Johor Bahru	Kuantan (Indera Mahkota)	Kuching	Kota Kinabalu	Port Klang	Muar	Seri Manjung
21 (7 am)	65	72	61	66	76	44	51	47	36	89	67	78
21 (11 am)	64	76	61	66	79	44	52	—N/a	35	91	67	75
21 (5 pm)	64	80	75	68	92	46	53	—N/a	36	90	71	73
22 (7 am)	59	74	62	67	107	51	58	46	46	80	82	67
22 (11 am)	59	75	65	68	116	52	59	48	48	82	91	67
22 (5 pm)	59	84	110	70	99	54	68	50	51	94	103	67
23 (7 am)	61	85	89	87	86	52	76	58	56	105	116	84
23 (11 am)	62	87	93	89	79	50	77	60	57	103	111	87
23 (5 pm)	66	71	93	93	78	45	70	59	58	97	94	94
24 (7 am)	78	67	82	87	63	32	57	56	57	91	58	118
24 (11 am)	77	63	78	86	59	31	54	54	57	89	51	123
24 (5 pm)	79	61	64	84	59	35	51	55	55	81	49	120
25 (7 am)	—N/a	53	59	80	58	38	52	52	51	81	42	96
25 (11 am)	87	51	59	79	58	42	52	53	50	86	45	94
25 (5 pm)	87	53	63	75	57	46	53	53	50	88	46	91
26 (7 am)	73	53	63	56	52	47	46	52	54	69	51	76
26 (11 am)	69	54	63	51	53	47	42	51	55	63	48	73
26 (5 pm)	60	54	56	45	54	51	40	52	54	73	47	72
27 (7 am)	54	56	56	40	54	54	40	49	56	75	38	77
27 (11 am)	54	55	52	41	52	53	41	43	55	72	37	74
27 (5 pm)	54	60	53	42	50	50	44	36	54	57	40	69
0–50 Good 51–100 Moderate 101–200 Unhealthy 201–300 Very unhealthy >301 Hazardous

=== Singapore ===
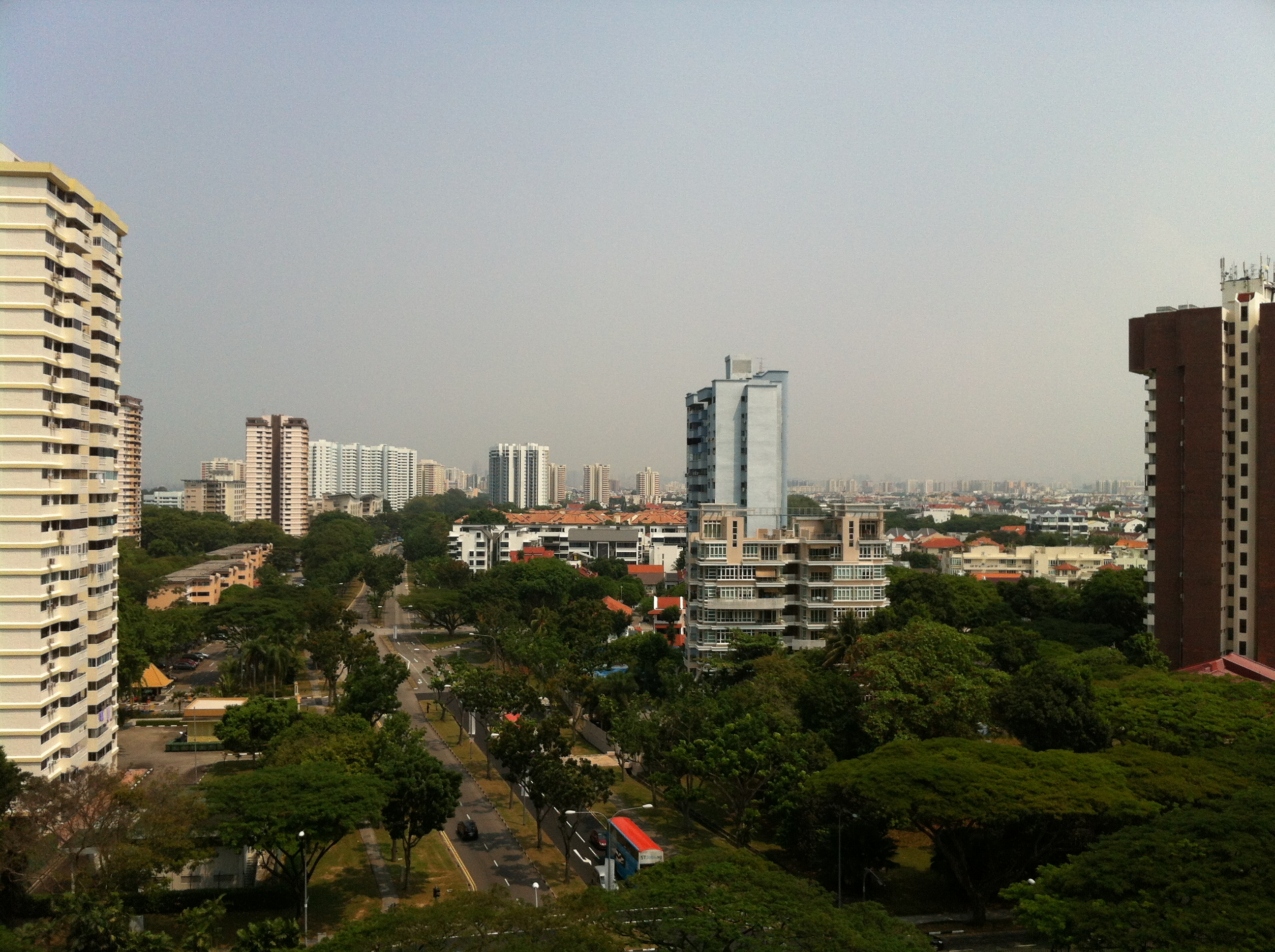
Bedok South Ave 1, looking west towards Marine Parade at 12:04 PM on 24 June 2013.

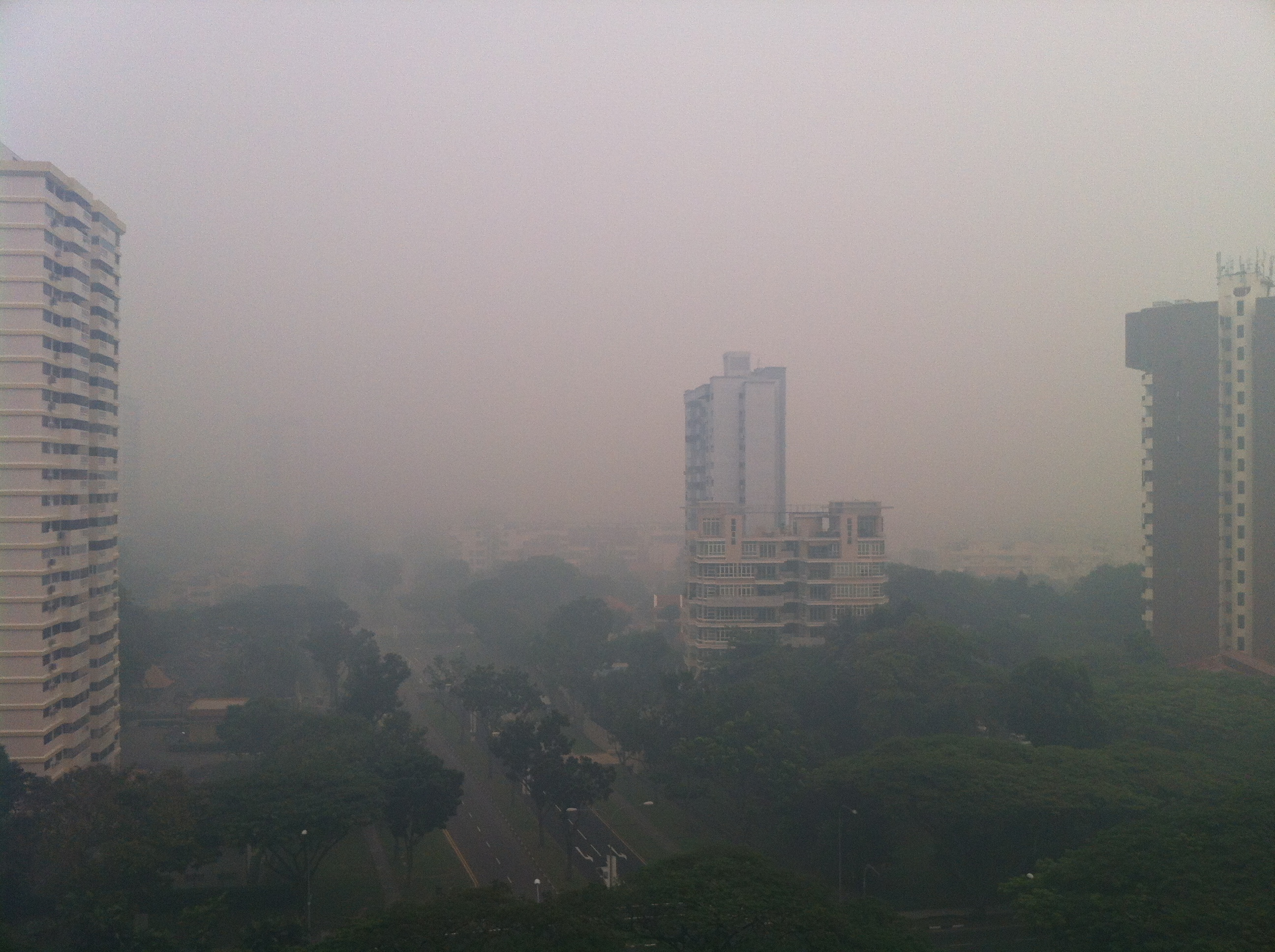
Same vantage point on 21 June 2013 at 10:35 am, when the haze was at hazardous levels.

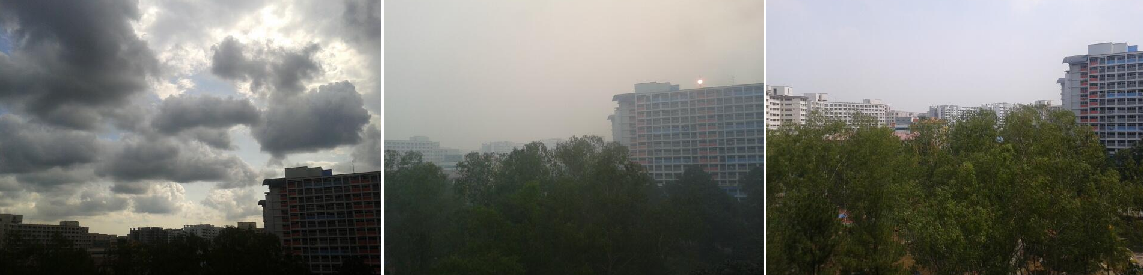
Comparison of the effects of the haze on Singapore. Left: Before the haze (Taken 4 May, PSI "Good") Middle: During the haze (Taken 19 June, PSI "Unhealthy") Right: After the haze (Taken 23 June, PSI "Moderate")

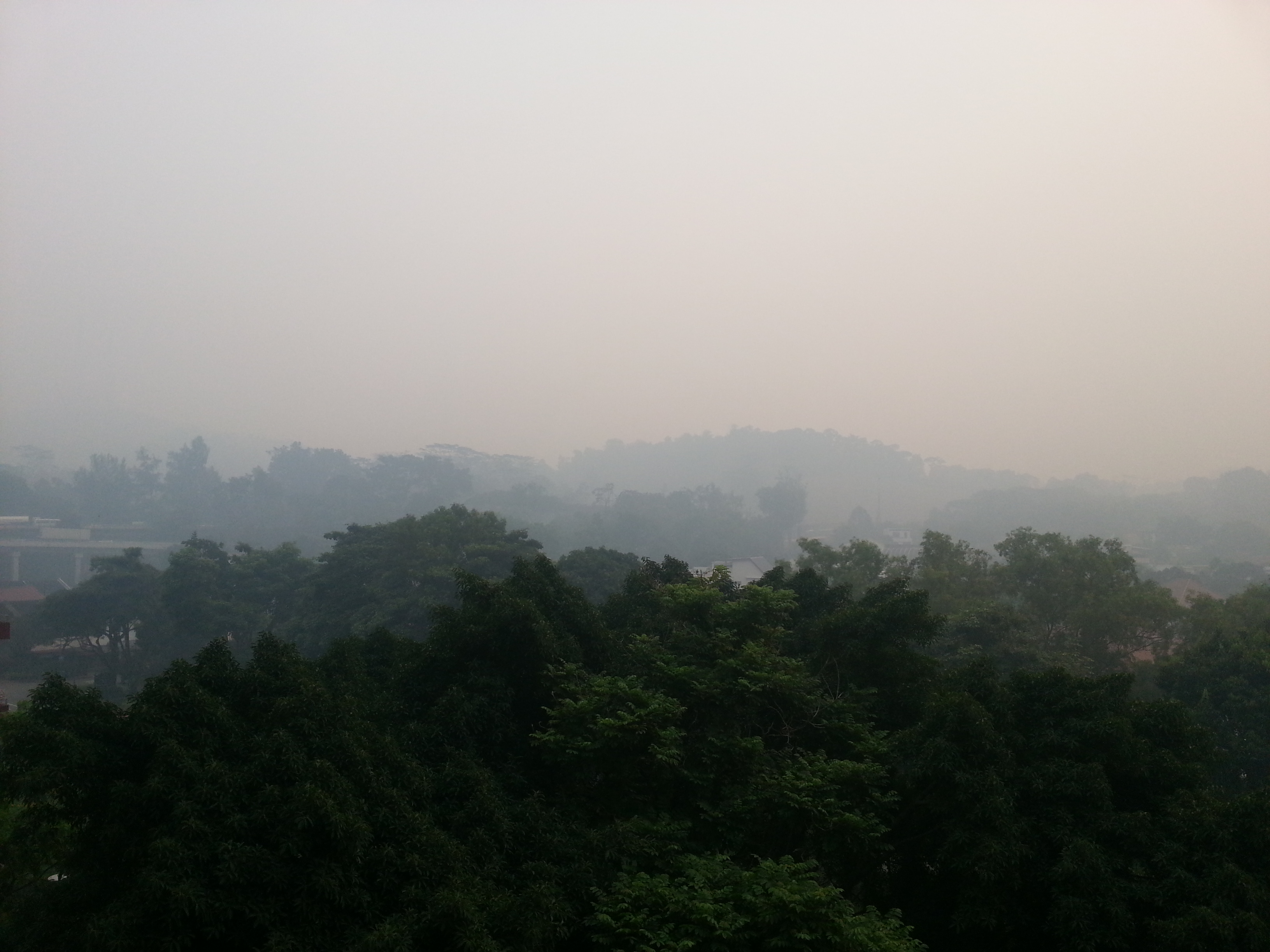
The effects of the haze on Singapore. Normally, the hills in the background can be clearly seen.

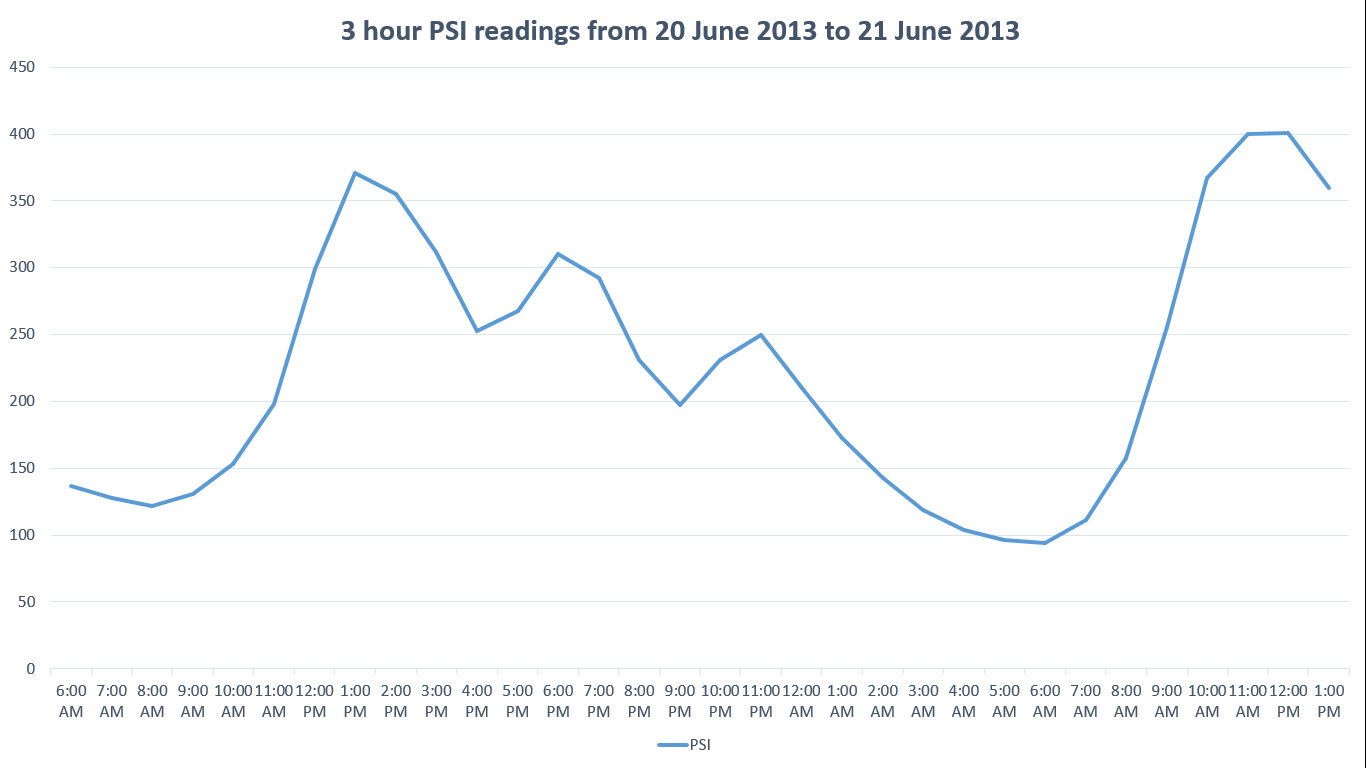
The graph plots the PSI readings released by NEA from 20 to 21 June 2013. At 12 pm. on 21 June 2013, the readings reached a record-breaking level of 401, in the highest possible Hazardous range.

Mild haze began to affect Singapore on 13 June, before air quality worsened and remained in the Unhealthy range for a few days. Pollutant Standards Index (PSI) first hit levels unseen in 16 years when a PSI of 155 was recorded at 10 pm. on 17 June 2013. The highest in the 16 years of the haze was finally broken. At 10 pm. on 19 June 2013, the 3-hour PSI reading of 321 breached the Hazardous zone for the first time in history, surpassing its previous record of 226 (Very unhealthy) during the 1997 haze. However, the 10 pm. reading was released 57 minutes late at 10:57 pm. and the reading soon decreased to 282 at 11 pm, and 218 at 12 am, both of which are in the Very unhealthy range. At 1 pm. on 20 June 2013, the 3-hour PSI reading reached record levels once again with a reading of 371 in the Hazardous range, a jump from 299 an hour ago, which was only one point shy of the "Hazardous" level. The PM2.5 concentration also reached 300 for the first time in the nation's history.

At 11 am on 21 June 2013, another new all-time high was recorded, with a PSI of 400. The new record was broken again at 12 pm, with the PSI remaining in the Hazardous range at 401.

As with prior haze events, this strained ties between Indonesia and Singapore, with Indonesia swiftly pushing the blame for the haze to Singapore and Malaysia, which invested in palm oil firms in the area of the burning. The Prime Minister of Singapore, Lee Hsien Loong, as well as Vivian Balakrishnan, the Singaporean Minister of Environment and Water Resources, expressed concern over the haze and called on Indonesia to do more to resolve the issue. However, Indonesian officials became irate at the demands, and on Thursday Indonesia's Coordinating Minister for People's Welfare Agung Laksono accused Singapore of acting "like a child." In response, Singapore's Emeritus Senior Minister Goh Chok Tong responded that "the Singapore Child is being suffocated", borrowing the same descriptor to highlight the nation's innocence yet vulnerability in the haze crisis.

While cloud seeding was suggested to get rid of the haze, Singapore's meteorological service found it not possible because of insufficient cloud cover.

Initially, face masks were sold out in major drugstores and other retailers because of strong demand, although the Ministry of Health subsequently reassured the public that restocks were being distributed from its armoury of close to nine million N95 masks. More than 4 million masks were distributed after that, with 1 million masks to constituencies and the remaining 3 million to retailers.

The Manpower Ministry refrained from issuing a stop-work order, saying that the Government would do so only if the haze worsened severely.

On 22 June 2013, the haze started giving way to clear skies as the PSI dropped from 326 at 10 am in the Hazardous range to 73 at 5 pm in the Moderate range. The next day, the improvement was sustained in the morning, with the PSI in the Moderate range. The improvement in the air quality was due to a change in the direction of the low level winds over Singapore, from south-westerly to southerly. As dry conditions and winds blowing from the southwest or west persisted, the 24-hour PSI reading for the rest of the day was expected to be in the Moderate range. However, in the night the PSI reached 102, which is in the Unhealthy range, in the west. The readings increased as the night passed.

In the late afternoon of 25 June 2013, thunderstorms accompanied by strong, gusty winds drenched many parts of Singapore with heavy rain and hailstones even fell in the western part of Singapore. The storms were a welcome respite, after Singapore had endured a week of record-breaking haze and no rain. There was a huge decrease in the PSI.

Singapore's Minister for the Environment and Water Resources Dr Vivian Balakrishnan assured Singaporeans that Singapore's water quality had not been affected by the haze.

On 30 June 2013, a morning shower caused a significant decrease in the 3-hour PSI readings. The PSI had dropped into the Good range. However, PM2.5 concentrations for the past few days had remained unhealthy, and this was predicted to continue into the coming days.

On 1 July, the PSI readings remained in the Good range for most of the day. The highest PSI readings of the day were 49–53 (Moderate). PSI readings on 2 and 3 July were also in the Good range.

On 5 July 2013, a PSI reading of 6 was recorded – the lowest reading since the haze started blowing towards Singapore.

Despite Malaysia getting hit by the haze on 21 and 22 July, Singapore remained relatively unaffected, as the winds were mainly blowing from the south or southeast.

On 26 July, the PSI reached the 40s for the first time in weeks, reaching a high of 46.

On 31 July, the PSI reached a high of 44, but decreased again the next day because of thunderstorms.

On 20 August, the haze briefly returned to Singapore during the afternoon with the PSI rising to 55.

==== Measures taken ====
Over the first four days of the haze, the government and other institutions implemented a series of safety precautions meant to reduce exposure to the haze. Most were focused on restricting outdoor activities. Schools and childcare centres began restricting outdoor activities. It was announced that should the haze situation worsen, schools would be closed and the Ministry of Manpower Singapore might issue a stop-work order; the Ministry of Education declared all school activities in June cancelled on 21 June 2013. In addition, talks with Indonesia were initiated. The Singapore Government distributed a few hundred thousand respirators to households without the means to purchase their own, while the country's top Islam board allowed Muslims to not attend Friday prayer at mosques should they deem fit.

==== Pollutant Standard Index readings ====
24-hour PSI readings in June 2013
Based on PM2.5 concentration only.

Date (Time)	North	South	East	West	Central	Overall
19 (4 pm)	121	115	101	118	107	101–121
20 (8 am)	168	173	156	171	152	152–173
20 (12 pm)	178	196	180	180	169	169–196
20 (4 pm)	193	214	193	191	179	179–214
20 (11 pm)	196	236	196	199	182	182–236
21 (8 am)	197	196	180	198	170	170–198
21 (9 am)	205	205	184	209	175	175–209
21 (10 am)	219	216	186	220	179	179–220
21 (11 am)	217	220	186	227	180	180–227
21 (12 pm)	210	232	188	225	181	181–232
21 (3 pm)	190	225	181	196	173	173–225
21 (4 pm)	185	225	177	194	171	171–225
21 (5 pm)	177	216	175	189	166	166–216
21 (6 pm)	173	200	169	182	161	161–200
21 (7 pm)	174	197	167	179	159	159–197
21 (8 pm)	173	194	166	175	158	158–194
21 (9 pm)	172	189	163	172	155	155–189
21 (10 pm)	170	186	160	169	154	154–186
21 (11 pm)	170	183	159	169	154	154–183
22 (12 am)	170	183	159	170	155	155–183
22 (1 am)	171	185	160	172	156	156–185
22 (2 am)	172	189	162	176	159	159–189
22 (3 am)	174	192	165	180	162	162–192
22 (4 am)	176	197	168	184	166	166–197
22 (5 am)	179	204	171	188	170	170–204
22 (6 am)	182	226	177	193	173	173–226
22 (7 am)	183	241	184	194	177	177–241
22 (8 am)	182	246	185	194	179	179–246
22 (9 am)	180	241	184	194	177	177–241
22 (10 am)	178	235	182	194	176	176–235
22 (11 am)	178	229	181	193	175	175–229
22 (12 pm)	180	216	193	177	173	173–216
22 (1 pm)	182	199	176	191	173	173–199
22 (2 pm)	181	197	175	189	172	172–197
22 (3 pm)	178	193	174	185	170	170–193
22 (4 pm)	175	187	173	181	167	167–187
22 (5 pm)	171	185	170	178	165	165–185
22 (6 pm)	168	184	168	176	162	162–184
22 (7 pm)	163	182	165	175	161	161–182
22 (8 pm)	160	180	163	172	159	159–180
22 (9 pm)	157	178	161	169	157	157–178
22 (10 pm)	154	175	159	166	153	153–175
22 (11 pm)	151	171	154	162	148	148–171
23 (12 am)	148	167	151	158	144	144–167
23 (1 am)	144	164	147	153	141	144–164
23 (2 am)	141	160	144	147	137	137–160
23 (3 am)	138	157	141	143	134	134–157
23 (4 am)	134	154	139	139	130	130–154
23 (5 am)	130	150	137	136	127	127–150
23 (6 am)	127	143	132	132	124	124–143
23 (7 am)	123	136	125	126	120	120–136
23 (8 am)	119	128	118	119	114	114–128
23 (9 am)	115	121	112	112	108	108–121
23 (10 am)	110	114	105	107	101	101–114
23 (11 am)	104	106	98	100	95	95–106
23 (12 pm)	96	98	91	94	88	88–98
23 (1 pm)	91	95	84	93	84	84–95
23 (2 pm)	89	93	82	93	82	82–93
23 (3 pm)	88	94	81	94	82	81–94
23 (4 pm)	89	94	82	95	82	82–95
23 (5 pm)	89	94	82	96	82	82–96
23 (6 pm)	89	93	81	97	81	81–97
23 (7 pm)	88	92	81	99	81	81–99
23 (8 pm)	87	90	80	102	79	79–102
23 (9 pm)	85	89	79	105	78	78–105
23 (10 pm)	83	88	78	109	77	77–109
23 (11 pm)	82	87	77	110	76	76–110
24 (12 am)	80	87	76	109	75	75–109
24 (1 am)	79	86	75	108	74	74–108
24 (2 am)	78	84	73	108	73	73–108
24 (3 am)	76	82	71	107	72	71–107
24 (4 am)	74	79	69	105	70	69–105
24 (5 am)	72	76	66	103	68	68–103
24 (6 am)	70	73	64	101	66	64–101
24 (7 am)	67	71	62	98	64	62–98
24 (8 am)	65	68	60	96	62	60–96
24 (9 am)	63	66	59	93	60	59–93
24 (10 am)	61	64	58	91	59	58–91
24 (11 am)	60	63	57	90	57	57–90
24 (12 pm)	59	62	56	89	57	56–89
24 (1 pm)	58	61	56	89	56	56–89
24 (2 pm)	58	61	55	88	56	55–88
24 (3 pm)	58	61	55	88	57	55–88
24 (4 pm)	59	61	55	88	57	55–88
24 (5 pm)	61	62	55	87	58	55–87
24 (6 pm)	61	62	55	85	59	55–85
24 (7 pm)	70	63	55	83	59	55–83
24 (8 pm)	77	64	55	80	60	55–80
24 (9 pm)	77	63	55	76	60	55–77
24 (10 pm)	77	62	55	73	60	55–77
24 (11 pm)	77	61	55	71	59	55–77
0–50 Good 51–100 Moderate 101–200 Unhealthy 201–300 Very unhealthy

3-hour PSI readings in June 2013
Based on PM10 concentration only.

Date/Time	12 am	1 am	2 am	3 am	4 am	5 am	6 am	7 am	8 am	9 am	10 am	11 am	12 pm	1 pm	2 pm	3 pm	4 pm	5 pm	6 pm	7 pm	8 pm	9 pm	10 pm	11 pm
17	—N/a	—N/a	—N/a	—N/a	—N/a	—N/a	—N/a	56	56	55	57	64	80	95	100	105	111	110	111	117	140	152	155	150
18	145	—N/a	—N/a	—N/a	—N/a	—N/a	109	106	108	115	121	123	114	104	95	90	85	81	82	88	97	108	122	133
19	134	—N/a	—N/a	—N/a	—N/a	—N/a	77	78	80	84	91	103	124	152	170	172	158	146	144	161	190	290	321	282
20	218	195	—N/a	—N/a	—N/a	—N/a	137	128	122	131	153	198	299	371	355	312	253	268	310	292	231	197	231	250
21	210	173	143	119	104	96	94	111	158	256	367	400	401	360	245	168	145	143	139	135	137	142	153	168
22	180	183	180	179	177	180	190	231	292	323	326	322	319	263	178	122	85	73	73	77	82	87	90	91
23	91	90	88	89	93	99	104	106	105	101	96	90	83	80	78	78	77	77	76	75	75	76	79	80
24	76	70	64	59	54	51	48	47	47	47	49	52	54	59	65	72	79	82	79	75	72	68	65	61
0–50 Good 51–100 Moderate 101–200 Unhealthy 201–300 Very unhealthy >301 Hazardous

=== Southern Thailand ===
As of 25 June, the haze affected Southern Thailand according to the Thai News Agency. The haze affected the Yala Province first, causing irritation to the locals but not affecting visibility on the road. A day later, the haze in Pattani, Yala and Satun thickened and caused poor visibility on the road. Among the seven Southern Thailand provinces affected by the haze, Narathiwat was hit the worst, with particulate matter levels there reaching 129 μg/m^{3}, a level which is considered adverse to health.

==== Measures taken ====
The provincial public health offices have advised the public to wear a face mask and avoid any outdoor activities.

== Reactions ==
- Indonesia – Indonesian officials stated that farmers were being educated by the government on alternatives to clearing land, instead of the traditional slash-and-burn method. A foreign ministry official said that the government planned to use cloud-seeding to extinguish the fires that were causing the haze. Agung Laksono, the Indonesian Minister for People's Welfare, called for Singapore to cease "making all this noise" and accused the country of "behaving like a child", insisting that Singapore companies that own plantations on Sumatra must share the blame. On 21 June 2013, Indonesia's Forestry Ministry general secretary Hadi Daryanto said that Indonesia's efforts to fight the fires might not be effective without help in the form of a heavy downpour, which Indonesia's meteorological service predicted to occur on 28 June. The fire had engulfed more than 3,000 hectares (7,400 acres) of plantations and forests, and it was no longer possible to put out the widespread fire. Hadi also mentioned that it would take two weeks to use cloud-seeding to put out the fires, and that the haze could last for weeks, or even months, if there was no downpour. Other than deploying many firefighters to the scene, Indonesia also turned to water bombing to extinguish the fires. It was also mentioned that they would rather set a block around settlements to prevent the fire from burning homes. On 24 June 2013, Indonesian President Susilo Bambang Yudhoyono apologised to Singapore and Malaysia about the haze situation and that he hoped to seek the neighbours' understanding. He promised to try his best to tackle the haze problem and emphasised that the Indonesian authorities would find out the culprits behind the fire, bringing them to justice. Aside from that, Indonesia agreed to hasten a sub-regional meeting of five ASEAN countries on the transboundary haze till July after a meeting between Environment Minister, Balthasar Kambuaya and his Malaysian counterpart, G. Palanivel. On 27 June 2013, Indonesian hacking group Indonesia J.A.M.5 Team hacked the website of Eu Yan Sang, a Singapore company, in protest against the outrage in Singapore over the haze caused by Indonesia. "Bambu was here. Don't insult our country (Indonesia) for the haze in your country (Singapore). Don't blame Indonesia just because the air in your country is polluted. Blame the wind. Who told the wind to blow towards your country?".
- Malaysia – Prime Minister Datuk Seri Najib Razak said on Twitter that four ministers from four countries (Brunei, Indonesia, Singapore and Thailand) would meet in Malaysia to discuss the issue on 20 August 2013. Malaysia is also willing to send help to Sumatra and help Indonesia with cloud-seeding. Malaysian Minister of Natural Resources and Environment, Datuk Seri G. Palanivel was scheduled to meet his Indonesian counterpart to discuss ways to resolve the crisis. Additionally, he asked Indonesia to prove the involvement of Malaysian agricultural companies in the open burning in Sumatra, in response to their allegation claiming that many Malaysian companies were involved. Meanwhile, Malaysian Health Minister, Datuk Seri S. Subramaniam said that Malaysia would support any Indonesia's action against errant Malaysian companies involved in the slash-and-burn activities. Prime Minister Najib Razak sent an official letter to the Indonesian President seeking co-operation to punish those responsible.
- Singapore – On 21 June, Emeritus Senior Minister Goh Chok Tong stated on his Facebook page that "the Singapore Child is being suffocated, how can he not scream?". This was in response to Agung Laksono's comments on Singaporeans "behaving like a child" over the haze issue, made the day before. Using an example of Malaysian and Singaporeans being neighbours, he stressed that one should be considerate for another and co-operate with one another in fighting the haze instead of blaming one another. He then quoted an act of "burning our garden refuse openly if the smoke will enter our neighbour's house" for instance. On 22 June 2013, Minister for Foreign Affairs and Minister for Law K. Shanmugam urged the Indonesia government to take "decisive action" towards the haze situation. In response to provocative remarks made by several Indonesian ministers, he stressed that the attitude by those ministers will not improve the problem any further, instead the main concern should be dedicated in solving the haze situation. He has added that Indonesia has not been carrying "the same tone of cooperation" that both countries once had over the years. On 25 June, Singapore Prime Minister Lee Hsien Loong accepted Indonesia President Susilo Bambang's apology wholeheartedly, and said that the apology was a very gracious act. He also welcomed Susilo's promise to try his best to tackle the haze problem. PM Lee also said that Singapore was ready to work closely with Indonesia, Malaysia and other ASEAN countries to find a permanent solution to prevent the haze problem from recurring annually. When the number of hotspots spiked in mid-July, Singapore also offered to assist Indonesia in putting out the fires, to prevent the haze from affecting Singapore again. An aircraft was also offered to help with cloud-seeding over the hotspots.
- Thailand – Prime Minister Yingluck Shinawatra expressed her concern about the haze that has spread to Southern Thailand. While, Thailand Minister of Foreign Affairs Surapong Tovichakchaikul said that he would bring up the issue at the upcoming ASEAN meeting and discuss with other bloc members how to help Indonesia to tackle the problem. He also said that Malaysia and Singapore had proposed to hold the ASEAN meeting sooner than scheduled, so the bloc members could help.

=== International reactions ===
- Greenpeace International – The environmental organisation thought of the situation as an "international problem", stating that "nothing could be more illustrative of forest destruction than the polluting haze that is coming from Sumatra". It urged the parties responsible for the haze to take preventive actions. Greenpeace also called on big palm oil companies such as Malaysia-based Sime Darby and Singapore-based Wilmar International to check whether their suppliers were involved in the burning.

== Comparison with previous haze events in Southeast Asia ==
Forest and land fires have been an annual occurrence in Sumatra in recent history. In the period from 2006 to 2013, the cumulative hotspot count in 2013 was the fifth highest. There were more hotspots in 2012, 2006, 2007 and 2009.

The record-breaking pollution levels in Singapore and Peninsular Malaysia in June 2013 were caused by a combination of a spike in hotspots in Sumatra and wind patterns which directed the smoke towards Singapore and Malaysia during that month.

There were more than 8,000 fire alerts in Sumatra in June 2013. Over the past 12 years, there have only been three other months with more than 8,000 fire alerts – all of which occurred in 2006.

== See also ==
- Air quality index
- Asian brown cloud
- Borneo peat swamp forests
- Deforestation in Borneo
- People's Movement to Stop Haze
- Pollutant Standards Index
