= Riau Ecosystem Restoration =

Indonesian forest restoration project

- RER
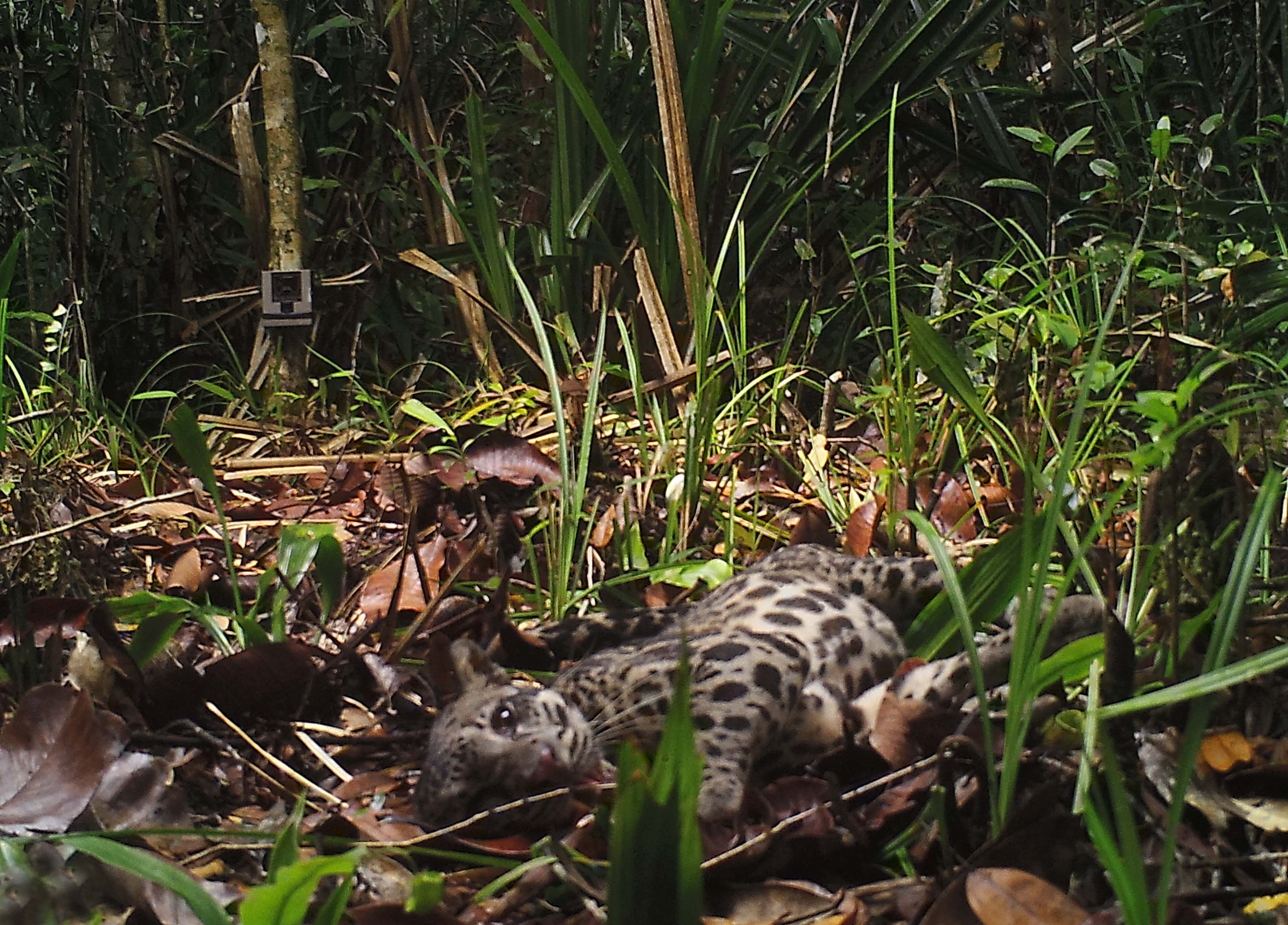
- A Sumatran clouded leopard caught on a camera trap in RER

- Location within Sumatra
- Coordinates: 0.531319°N 102.662588°E
- Area: 150,000 hectares (370,000 acres)
- Established: 2013
- Partners: APRIL Group; BIDARA; Fauna & Flora International
- Website: www.rekoforest.org

Riau Ecosystem Restoration (RER; Indonesian: Restorasi Ekosistem Riau) is a multi-party project to restore and conserve an area of ecologically important peat forest in Indonesia's Sumatra island. The project consists of 130,000 ha (320,000 acres) on the Kampar Peninsula, and another 20,000 ha (49,000 acres) on the nearby Padang Island.

== Background ==
RER comprises 150,000 ha (370,000 acres) of forest on the east coast of Sumatra, to the south west of Singapore. The peatland area is one of the largest in Southeast Asia, and is home to a number of threatened and endangered species.

The forests in the area have been degraded by years of illegal logging and slash and burn land clearance to make room for agriculture. Many canals have been dug then abandoned, lowering the water levels of the peat swamp and drying out the organic material it contains. This causes it to decompose and raises the risk of fire, both of which release large amounts of carbon dioxide into the atmosphere.

Despite this, the area retains exceptionally high carbon stocks, and is rich in biodiversity. As such it was identified by the Indonesian government as a potential area for an Ecosystem Restoration Concession (known in full as Timber Forest Product Utilization License for Ecosystem Restoration, or IUPHHK-RE), a market-orientated approach launched in 2009 to involve the private sector in conserving 1,700,000 ha (4,200,000 acres) of land.

RER was granted an IUPHHK-RE license in 2013 to conserve 20,000 ha (49,000 acres) by the Indonesian Ministry of Environment and Forestry, with another three licenses granted in 2015 to bring the total area to its current 150,000 hectares. The licenses are valid for 60 years.

== Approach ==
Funded by a US$100 million commitment over 10 years from pulp and paper company APRIL Group, RER employs a four-phase approach to restore and conserve the area

- Protect: RER employs guards and rangers to patrol the area to prevent illegal encroachment. The area is also largely surrounded by APRIL's commercial plantations which can serve as a buffer, and RER works with neighboring communities to provide education and training on sustainable farming methods to enable them to earn a living without damaging the environment.
- Assess: RER investigates the present condition of the flora, fauna and wildlife habitats to establish a baseline for conservation. See Biodiversity
- Restore: RER restores degraded sites by taking seedlings from surrounding forests and growing them in nurseries before replanting them. Water levels are restored by searching for and blocking previously-dug canals.
- Manage: RER is developing long-term management plans to ensure the long-term sustainability of the area once it has been restored. This includes consultation with local communities, government and the concession license holders of adjacent forests.

== Community ==
The area surrounding RER is home to approximately 17,000 people, many of whom rely on the forest for their livelihood. RER attempts to ensure that traditional activities such as fishing and honey gathering are preserved while providing education and training on sustainable practices. This includes banning fishing using electrocution, the releasing of fish into rivers to ensure a sustainable supply, and assistance in marketing local produce.

RER also recruits from local communities and sources from local suppliers where possible to give the population a stake in the area’s long-term sustainability and to demonstrate that conservation can have economic benefits.

== Partners ==
RER involves multiple partners. RER was established by pulp and paper company APRIL Group in 2013. APRIL serves as the project sponsor and technical manager and has committed US$100 million over the first 10 years to the project. RER forms part of the company’s Sustainable Forest Management Policy, which includes a commitment to maintain conservation areas equal in size to its plantations.

Indonesian non-governmental organization BIDARA focuses on local communities, developing programs to foster sustainability and self-reliance in people living near the area. BIDARA introduces intensive vegetable farming using no-burn techniques to communities around RER with crops such as chilies, eggplants and red ginger. BIDARA also trains communities in goat-rearing to provide organic fertilizer. Since 2015, Fauna & Flora International has conducted a series of field surveys on key elements of the project related to biodiversity, climate and communities. In 2016, RER and FFI published the first-ever inventory of the species of the area, Biodiversity of the Kampar Peninsula.

== Reception ==
Upon its launch the project was described as 'greenwashing' by Indonesian NGO Forest Rescue Network Riau (Jikalahari). RER was defended by then Forestry Minister Zulkifli Hasan Zulkifli Hasan, who stated that as the first such project to involve the private and public sector it would serve as a model to support the government's efforts to balance "responsible forest industry development with conservation of important forest areas."

== See also ==
- Wildlife of Indonesia
