= Rapp (surname) =

Rapp is a surname. Notable people with the surname include:

- Adam Rapp (born 1968), American novelist
- Alfred Rapp (1933–2011), German politician
- Anders Rapp (1927–1998), Swedish geomorphologist
- Anthony Rapp (born 1971), American stage and film artist
- Barbara Rapp (born 1972), Austrian artist
- Bernard Rapp (1945–2006), French film director and television news presenter
- C. J. Rapp, American beverage inventor
- Danny Rapp (1941–1983), American musician
- Elizabeth Farrow Rapp (1926–2010), All-American Girls Professional Baseball League player
- Emily Susan Rapp (born 1974), American author and academic
- George Rapp (1757–1847), pietist, German-American religious leader of the Harmony Society
- Jean Rapp (1771–1821), French lieutenant general
- Johan Rapp (born 2001), Swedish footballer
- Karl Friedrich Rapp (1882–1962), German engineer, founder of Rapp Motorenwerke GmbH
- Katharina Rapp (born 1948), German artist
- Larry Rapp (born 1948), American actor
- Lea Bayers Rapp (born 1946), American non-fiction writer
- Marcel Rapp (born 1979), German football manager
- Marcello Rapp, better known as "Cello Dias", bass guitarist for Against All Will
- Marco Rapp (born 1991), German footballer
- Mitch Rapp, fictional character
- Nicki Rapp (born 1972), American video game voice actress
- Nicolai Rapp (born 1996), German footballer
- Patrick Rapp (born 1969), German politician
- Peter Rapp (born 1983), German long jumper
- Philip Rapp (1907–1996), film and television director and screenwriter
- Ray Rapp (born 1945), a Democratic member of the North Carolina General Assembly
- Reneé Rapp (born 2000), American actress and singer
- Richard Rapp, former New York City Ballet dancer
- Siegfried Rapp (1915–1982), German one-handed classical pianist
- Simone Rapp (born 1992), Swiss footballer
- Taylor Rapp (born 1997), American football player
- Tom Rapp (1947–2018), American singer-songwriter
- Torsten Rapp (1905–1993), Swedish Air Force general
- Vern Rapp (1928–2015), Major League Baseball manager and coach
- Valentin Rapp (born 1992), German squash player

== See also ==
- Rapp and Rapp, an architectural firm
