= Riau Andalan Pulp & Paper =

Indonesian pulp and paper company

Riau Andalan Pulp & Paper (RAPP) is the main pulp and paper subsidiary of Asia Pacific Resources International Holdings Limited, or APRIL Group. Operating in Riau Province, Sumatra, Indonesia, RAPP runs one of the largest pulp mills in the world.

== Operations ==
The pulp and paper mill located at Pangkalan Kerinci in Riau Province, Sumatra, Indonesia is capable of producing up to 2.8 million tonnes of pulp and 1.15 million tonnes of paper per year.

== Sustainability ==
RAPP's parent company APRIL Group became the first Indonesian forest company to receive the sustainable forest management certification from the Programme for the Endorsement of Forest Certification (PEFC) in June 2015.

It was later accepted as an International Stakeholder member by PEFC in February 2016.

APRIL's operations are also certified under OHSAS 18001 (Safety Management Systems), ISO 9001 (Quality Management Systems), and ISO 14001 (Environment Management Systems).

== Economic impact ==
RAPP employs approximately 5,800 people in Indonesia.

A 1999-2014 analysis by the Institute of Economic and Social Research – Faculty of Economics and Business, University of Indonesia estimates APRIL's historic contribution to Riau province's GDP at 5.2%.

== Fire prevention ==
In 2015 APRIL launched the Fire Free Village Program, a community-level program to provide alternatives to clearing land using fire, one of the main causes of forest fire in Indonesia. By providing training, equipment and economic incentives to prevent burning, FFVP cut fire by 97% in partner villages from 2014 to 2017.

Through APRIL, in 2016 RAPP became a founding member of the Fire Free Alliance, a voluntary group of companies and organisations who share information and resources to fight forest fire in Southeast Asia.

RAPP is also one of several private sector companies working with the Indonesian government to apply the lessons of community programs such as FFVP on a national level.

== Controversy ==
In 2016 NGOs Greenpeace and WWF suspended partnership with APRIL Group after RAPP dug a canal through peat forest in breach of government regulation. APRIL's independent Stakeholder Advisory Committee accepted that the incident was the result of unintentional mistakes in interpreting and implementing government regulation.
