= IFK Värnamo =

Sportsclub in Värnamo, Sweden

- Full name: Idrottsföreningen Kamraterna Värnamo
- Founded: 1912; 114 years ago
- Ground: Finnvedsvallen, Värnamo
- Capacity: 5,000
- Chairman: Fredrik Lingeskog
- Head coach: Srdjan Tufegdžić
- League: Superettan
- 2025: Allsvenskan, 16th ▼ (relegated)
- Website: ifkvarnamo.se
Home colours	Away colours

IFK Värnamo is a Swedish professional football club located in Värnamo. The club plays in the Superettan, the second tier of Swedish football. The most famous player from the club is Jonas Thern, who was captain of the Sweden national team when they finished third in the 1994 FIFA World Cup.

== Season to season ==
Season	Level	Division	Section	Position	Movements
1993	Tier 3	Division 2	Östra Götaland	9th	
1994	Tier 3	Division 2	Östra Götaland	7th	
1995	Tier 3	Division 2	Östra Götaland	12th	Relegated
1996	Tier 4	Division 3	Mellersta Götaland	1st	Promoted
1997	Tier 3	Division 2	Östra Götaland	10th	Relegation Playoffs
1998	Tier 3	Division 2	Östra Götaland	12th	Relegated
1999	Tier 4	Division 3	Sydvästra Götaland	4th	
2000	Tier 4	Division 3	Sydvästra Götaland	2nd	Promoted
2001	Tier 3	Division 2	Östra Götaland	8th	
2002	Tier 3	Division 2	Östra Götaland	3rd	
2003	Tier 3	Division 2	Östra Götaland	6th	
2004	Tier 3	Division 2	Östra Götaland	6th	
2005	Tier 3	Division 2	Södra Götaland	4th	Promoted
2006*	Tier 3	Division 1	Södra	10th	
2007	Tier 3	Division 1	Södra	5th	
2008	Tier 3	Division 1	Södra	7th	
2009	Tier 3	Division 1	Södra	7th	
2010	Tier 3	Division 1	Södra	1st	Promoted
2011	Tier 2	Superettan		13th	Relegation Playoffs
2012	Tier 2	Superettan		14th	Relegation Playoffs
2013	Tier 2	Superettan		14th	Relegation Playoffs
2014	Tier 2	Superettan		9th	
2015	Tier 2	Superettan		10th	
2016	Tier 2	Superettan		11th	
2017	Tier 2	Superettan		6th	
2018	Tier 2	Superettan		13th	Relegation Playoffs - Relegated
2019	Tier 3	Division 1	Södra	7th	
2020	Tier 3	Division 1	Södra	1st	Promoted
2021	Tier 2	Superettan		1st	Promoted
2022	Tier 1	Allsvenskan		10th	
2023	Tier 1	Allsvenskan		5th	
2024	Tier 1	Allsvenskan		14th	Relegation Playoffs
2025	Tier 1	Allsvenskan		16th	Relegated

* League restructuring in 2006 resulted in a new division being created at Tier 3 and subsequent divisions dropping a level.

== Attendances ==
In recent seasons IFK Värnamo have had the following average attendances:

Season	Average attendance	Division / Section	Level
2005	278	Div 2 Södra Götaland	Tier 3
2006	484	Div 1 Södra	Tier 3
2007	378	Div 1 Södra	Tier 3
2008	439	Div 1 Södra	Tier 3
2009	351	Div 1 Södra	Tier 3
2010	874	Div 1 Södra	Tier 3
2011	1,926	Superettan	Tier 2

* Attendances are provided in the Publikliga sections of the Svenska Fotbollförbundet website.

== Players ==
=== First-team squad ===
As of 1 September 2026

Note: Flags indicate national team as defined under FIFA eligibility rules; some limited exceptions apply. Players may hold more than one non-FIFA nationality.

No.	Pos.	Nation	Player
1	GK	FIN	Hugo Keto
2	DF	SWE	Johan Rapp
3	DF	SWE	Axel Björnström
4	DF	SWE	Samuel Ohlsson
5	DF	SWE	Doug Bergqvist
6	DF	SWE	Hugo Andersson
7	MF	SWE	Carl Johansson
8	MF	SWE	Hugo Mella (on loan from Sirius)
9	FW	FIN	Kai Meriluoto
10	FW	SWE	Viktor Claesson
11	MF	SWE	August Ljungberg (on loan from Sirius)
13	DF	SWE	Sigge Jansson
14	FW	SWE	Marcus Antonsson

No.	Pos.	Nation	Player
16	DF	SWE	Zakarias Råvik (on loan from Kalmar)
17	FW	SWE	Fred Bozicevic
18	DF	SWE	Arash Motaraghebjafarpour
21	MF	NGR	Ishaq Abdulrazak
22	MF	SWE	Simon Thern
23	MF	ISL	Logi Hrafn Róbertsson
24	MF	SLE	Mohamed Kamara
26	MF	SWE	Calle Johansson
28	MF	GHA	Mamadou Cellou Diallo
31	GK	SWE	Malcolm Moulare
32	DF	LTU	Armandas Raudonis
33	FW	NGR	Musa Akinfewa
39	GK	SWE	Liam Selin (on loan from Midtjylland)

=== Out on loan ===
Note: Flags indicate national team as defined under FIFA eligibility rules; some limited exceptions apply. Players may hold more than one non-FIFA nationality.

No. / Pos. / Nation / Player; 19 / DF / SWE / Erik Freij (at Husqvarna FF until 30 November 2026)	No. / Pos. / Nation / Player; 39 / GK / SWE / Viktor Andersson (at IFK Göteborg until 30 November 2026)

== Achievements ==
=== League ===
- Division 1 Södra:
  - Winners (2): 2010, 2020
- Superettan:
  - Winners (1): 2021
