= Fire Free Alliance =

The Fire Free Alliance (FFA) is a multi-stakeholder group initiated for the management of recurrent haze and fire problems occurring in Indonesia. The group was founded in 2016 by APRIL and Asian Agri, Musim Mas, Wilmar, and NGOs including PM.Haze, Rumah Pohon, and IDH. The FFA seeks to achieve fire prevention mainly via community engagement. As of 2017, FFA's initiatives are being implemented in more than 200 villages in Indonesia, covering more than 1.5 million hectares (3.7×10^{6} acres) of land.

== Members ==
Founding members of the FFA include:

- Asia Pacific Resources International Holdings Ltd. (APRIL)
- Asian Agri Group
- Musim Mas Holdings
- Wilmar International Limited
- PM.Haze [NGO]
- Rumah Pohon [NGO]
- IDH (The Sustainable Trade Initiative)[NGO]

In 2017 two more organisations joined the FFA, including:

- Sime Darby Berhad
- IOI Corporation Berhad

== History of FFA ==
The FFA was launched on 29 February 2016 in Jakarta. Based on the successful implementation of the Fire-Free Village Program (FFVP), a smaller-scaled fire management pilot program initiated and led by APRIL, the FFA currently seeks to implement the FFVP across a broader landscape. The FFVP, launched a year earlier in July 2015, was first implemented in nine villages in Riau, Indonesia. The FFVP focused on fire prevention and suppression, and encompassed a five-pronged approach including no-burning incentives for villagers, community fire crew leaders, sustainable agricultural alternatives, air quality monitoring, and a community awareness program. After encouraging results were seen, with fire incidence decreasing by up to 90 per cent, the programme was subsequently expanded to 20 villages. The successful implementation of the FFVP provided the impetus for the development of the FFA, which seeks to implement and scale the FFVP across to other communities and landscapes.

== Implementation ==
According to the group's 2016 Member Review, companies in the FFA currently engage with more than 200 villages with some or all of the following key projects:

No Burn Village Rewards	Rewarding villages that have no forest fires in areas allocated to them.
Village Crew Leader	A program to recruit individuals from local communities as fire prevention advocates and fire suppression specialists at the village level.
Sustainable Agricultural Assistance	Provision of suitable agricultural alternatives to fire for land management activities.
Community Fire Awareness	Development of a suitable range of community awareness tools that focus on the inappropriate use of fire and the impacts of burning
Air Quality Monitoring	Installation of Smoke Haze Air Quality monitors and the tracking and monitoring of associated health information
Pilot Programs	New programs developed and suggested by the FFA and the public.

== Impact of FFA's Initiatives ==
The debilitating effects of the 2015 fire season in Indonesia resulted in an international diplomatic situation, as neighbouring countries in the South-East Asia region including Malaysia and Singapore suffered from serious haze conditions. Since then, while the FFVP and FFA have been acknowledged for their positive influence, non-governmental organisations (NGOs) such as Greenpeace and Scale Up have critiqued the program for not doing enough.

According to the FFA's 2016 Members Review, members of the FFA achieved the following in 2016:

APRIL	50 villages in the Fire Aware Communities program with 18 villages in FFVP up from 9 villages engaged last year, Riau, Sumatra
Asian Agri	7 villages in Riau, 2 in Jambi in program evaluation since October 2016.
IDH	Supporting the CPO Fund to develop 5 villages in South Sumatra
Musim Mas	71 villages engaged in awareness
PM.Haze	Canal blocking project and the RSPO certified oil campaign for restaurants in Singapore with wide awareness raising success
Wilmar	Completed socialising “Fire-Free Community” programme to 61 villages and signed MOU with 42 communities in South Sumatra and Central Kalimantan.
Sime Darby	Implemented a “Fire Prevention through Sustainable Farming Practices” programme in 4 villages, worked with University of Riau (UNRI) and was successful in significantly reducing hotspots.
IOI Group	Implemented high conservation stock assessments, peatland mapping and initial peatland restoration. 50 people have been trained for Fire Awareness Training (FAT) by Manggala Agni Pontianak (10 from PT BSS, 20 from PT BNS and 20 from PT SKS), MoU with BKSDA Pontianak also to “Prevent and Patrol” in Boundary Concession and Conservation Area (2016–2020).
