= Rumbai =

District of Pekanbaru, Sumatra, Indonesia

Rumbai at present is a district of Pekanbaru, Riau Province, Sumatra, Indonesia. It was founded in the early 1950s as the Sumatra headquarters of Caltex Pacific Oil Company, now known as Chevron Pacific Indonesia, on the shores of the Siak River.

== History ==
In the early 1950s, Rumbai could only be reached from the outside world by river boat from Pekanbaru or from Bengkalis. A road was built by Caltex to the Minas and Duri oilfields and camps. Caltex staff (mostly American) traveled to Rumbai, Minas and Duri by plane from Jakarta or Singapore to Pekanbaru airport and then by boat across to Rumbai. The oil camp of Rumbai was a completely self-contained, mostly-expatriate community with offices, homes, school, hospital, water treatment, diesel generators, commissary, country club, swimming pool, and golf course.

In 1958, a floating bridge was built by Caltex over the Siak River. By 1962, Caltex had built an oil port and company town at the fishing village of Dumai on the coast and connected Duri to Dumai by road.
