= People's Movement to Stop Haze =

Singaporean non-governmental organisation

People's Movement to Stop Haze (PM.Haze) is a non-governmental organisation based in Singapore. It was founded in 2014 in response to the 2013 Southeast Asian haze, which has been recognised as one of the most serious haze episodes in over 16 years. PM.Haze started its work with an investigative research project to fire-prone areas in Riau Province, Indonesia and identified peatland degradation due to mismanagement of concession lands by irresponsible companies as the fundamental cause of the fires in the areas and the resulting transboundary haze pollution. In 2016, it became registered as a society. In 2017, it underwent a rebranding exercise and adopted a new logo to symbolise a constant flow for fresh, clean air with an arrow pointed upward to represent constructive action towards this. PM.Haze was mentioned by Minister for the Environment and Water Resources Masagos Zulkifli as he delivered Singapore's national statement at the United Nations Environment Assembly in Nairobi in December 2017.

== Aims ==
As a people's movement, it focuses on outreach, research and advocacy on haze related concerns. It aims to empower people with the knowledge, values and means to be drivers of global action to stop the haze and ultimately attain clean air for present and future generations.

== Work ==
PM.Haze conducts advocacy workshops, research efforts, and runs campaigns to increase awareness. It took part in the ASEAN Forum of National Bioethics Committees (NBCs) on Haze Pollution in Jakarta, Indonesia on 6 and 7 December 2017.

PM.Haze also conducts trips to Indonesia and Malaysia called "People's Expedition to Experience Peat (PEEP)". This is one of its on-the-ground solutions to enable people to experience the realities on the ground while directly helping out in projects to prevent fires and haze. In May 2017, it went to Sungei Tohor, a small village in the Riau province in Indonesia to build a canal block as part of the solution to stop haze.

=== Campaigns ===
==== 2015: We Breathe What We Buy ====
In 2015, PM.Haze launched the "We Breathe What We Buy" campaign in conjunction with the World Wildlife Foundation (WWF). This campaign uses the #XtheHaze tagline to encourage people to switch to brands that produce sustainable palm oil.

==== 2016: Go Haze Free ====
Following from this, the #GoHazeFree campaign was launched in 2016. It aims to encourage businesses to change to sustainable palm oil.
