= Alfred Rapp =

Paul Alfred Rapp (9 February 1933 – 25 July 2011) was a German economist and a regional politician. From 1975 to 1994, he was a member of the city council of the city of Mannheim. In 1996, he was awarded the Bundesverdienstkreuz am Bande. Prior to this, in 1994, he was awarded the Citizen's Medal in Silver of the City of Mannheim.

In 1955, he began his studies in macroeconomics at the University of Heidelberg and graduated in 1958.
