= Johan Rapp =

Swedish footballer

Personal information
- Date of birth: 8 February 2001 (age 25)
- Height: 1.87 m (6 ft 2 in)
- Position: Defender

Team information
- Current team: IFK Värnamo
- Number: 2

Youth career
- Västra Ingelstads IS
- Malmö FF

Senior career*
Years	Team	Apps	(Gls)
2020–2023	Landskrona BoIS	90	(4)
2024–	IFK Värnamo	56	(3)

International career
2018	Sweden U18	1	(0)
2020–2021	Sweden U20	1	(0)
- * Club domestic league appearances and goals as of 12 November 2026

Johan Rapp (born 8 February 2001) is a Swedish professional footballer who plays as a defender for IFK Värnamo in Allsvenskan.

== Career ==
Rapp started his youth career in Västra Ingelstads IS in Västra Ingelstad. Not only Rapp, but also Linus Borgström and Albin Sundgren graduated from the tiny club to play on Sweden's second tier. Rapp joined one of Sweden's largest clubs, Malmö FF, as a teenager. However, he found it hard to break into the first team. In the spring of 2020 he trialled with Mjällby AIF. He was capped as a youth international for Sweden U18 and U20.

Rapp signed for Landskrona BoIS in August 2020, where he made his competitive senior debut. He adapted to the team's three-back line.

After a good 2023 season, Rapp declined renewing his contract with Landskrona. Rapp decided on joining Allsvenskan team IFK Värnamo. He made his Allsvenskan debut in April 2024 against Elfsborg.
