= Asia Pacific Resources International Holdings =

Singapore pulp and paper mill and fibre plantation operator

Asia Pacific Resources International Holdings Limited (APRIL)
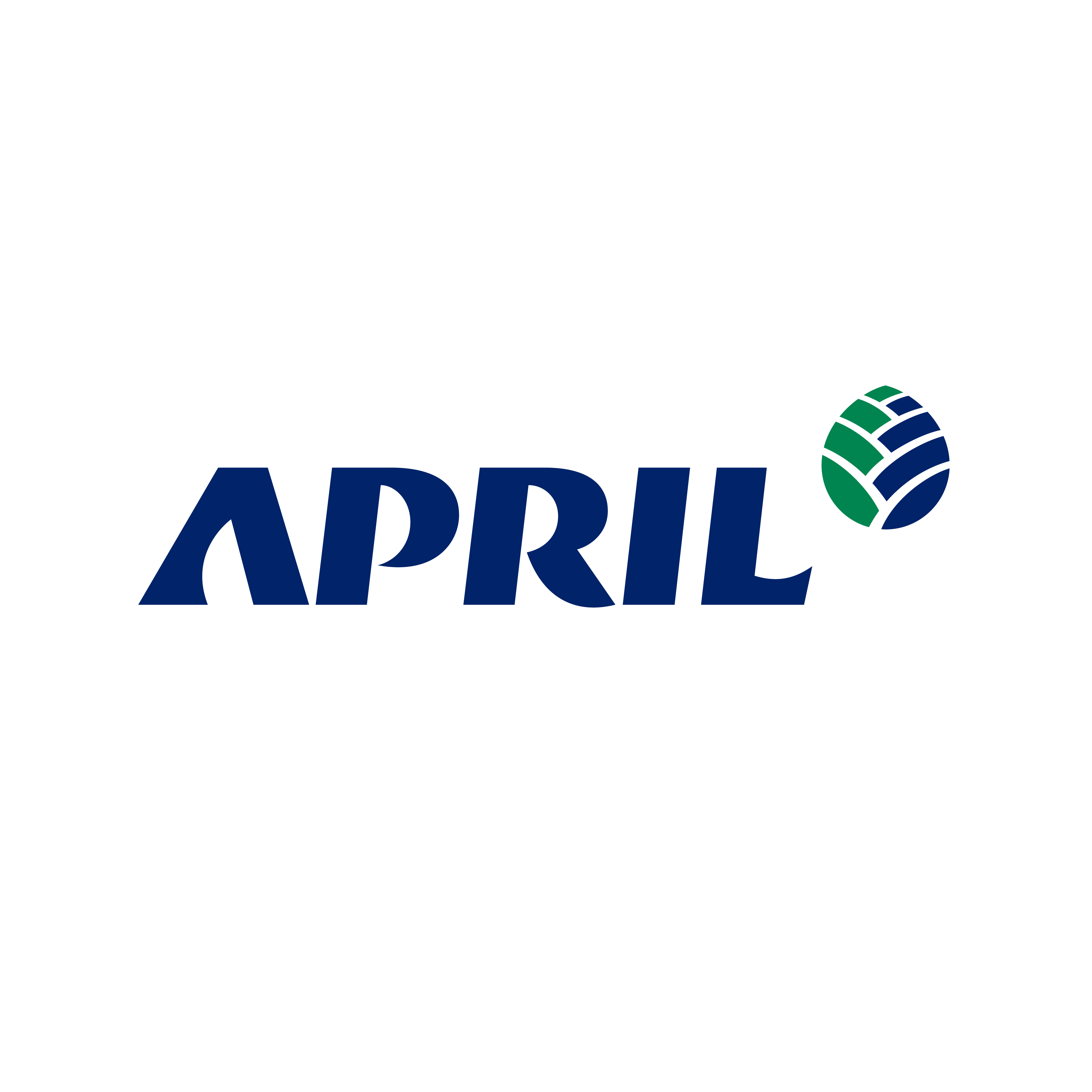
- Type: Private
- Industry: Pulp Paper and Mill
- Headquarters: Headquarters - Singapore, operations - Indonesia and China
- Key people: Chairman: Bey Soo Khiang; President: Praveen Singhavi
- Products: Pulp and Paper
- Website: aprilasia.com

Asia Pacific Resources International Holdings Limited, or APRIL, is a developer of fibre plantations and the owner of one of the world's largest pulp and paper mills with operations mainly in Indonesia and China. APRIL mainly produces bleached hardwood kraft pulp and uncoated, wood-free paper, including its Paperone brand of office paper. Founded in 1993, APRIL is managed by Royal Golden Eagle and owned by the Singapore-based Indonesian businessman Sukanto Tanoto. Royal Golden Eagle also manages companies in the paper, palm oil, construction, and energy sectors.

== Riau Andalan Pulp and Paper ==
APRIL's main pulp and paper subsidiary is Riau Andalan Pulp & Paper. PT RAPP, usually called RAPP Riau, operates in Riau Province, Sumatra, Indonesia. APRIL's pulp and paper mill located at Pangkalan Kerinci in Riau Province, Sumatra, Indonesia is capable of producing up to 2.8 million tonnes of pulp and 1.15 million tonnes of paper per year. Beginning operation in 1995, Friends of the Earth called RAPP the biggest paper pulp mill in the world, with a capacity of 2 million tonnes per year.

== Sustainability ==
=== Certification ===
In June 2015, APRIL became the first Indonesian forest company to receive the sustainable forest management certification from the Programme for the Endorsement of Forest Certification. The company previously received their chain-of-custody certification in 2010 for its manufacturing operations.

It was later accepted as an international stakeholder member by the Programme for the Endorsement of Forest Certification in February 2016.

APRIL's operations are also certified under OHSAS 18001 (Safety Management Systems), ISO 9001 (Quality Management Systems), and ISO 14001 (Environment Management Systems).

=== Eco-restoration ===
In 2013, APRIL established the Restorasi Ekosistem Riau project to restore, protect and manage 20,000 hectares of degraded peat forests. The eco-restoration area later expanded to 70,000 hectares in June 2015. The project is implemented in collaboration with Fauna and Flora International, The Nature Conservancy and social non-governmental organization Bidara. APRIL announced at COP21 a US$100 million investment over the course of 10 years focused on eco-restoration and conservation, in addition to doubling the eco-restoration area to 150,000 hectares.

=== Sustainable forest management policy ===
APRIL published its sustainable forest management policy in January 2014. As part of the policy, an independent stakeholder advisory committee comprising non-governmental organizations and forestry experts was set up to oversee its implementation Grievances and alleged violations of APRIL's the management policy highlighted by non-governmental organizations and civil society groups are reviewed by the stakeholder advisory committee and reported publicly at APRILdialog.com.

In June 2015, APRIL announced its enhanced sustainable forest management policy. The policy was cautiously received by non-governmental organizations and third party organisations. Greenpeace suspended its campaign against APRIL and announced it would be “watching closely to make sure that today’s announcement leads to real change on the ground.” World Wide Fund for Nature also expressed that they cautiously welcomed APRIL's enhanced Sustainable Forest Management Policy.

APRIL provides a grievance resolution procedure and a dashboard to monitor all grievance handling process in their website.

== Criticism and controversies ==
=== Environmental impact ===
APRIL has been criticised by non-governmental organizations for contributing to deforestation in Indonesia. In 2001, Friends of the Earth accused APRIL of fuelling the deforestation of Indonesia.

In June 2015, APRIL promised to halt deforestation and announced its enhanced Sustainable Forest Management Policy. As part of the new sustainability policy, APRIL said it was moving up by four years its plans to harvest only wood from its own plantations.

=== Forest Stewardship Council Disassociation ===
On August 8, 2013, Germany-based non-profit certification organisation Forest Stewardship Council announced that it has ended all association with APRIL after a complaint filed in May of that year by non-governmental organizations Greenpeace International, Rainforest Action Network and WWF Indonesia alleging violation of the council's policy of association.

In response, APRIL in a press statement, said that they “proactively withdrew from FSC certification of their own volition” earlier in July. In September, 2014, APRIL approached the Forest Stewardship Council to begin the processing of ending their disassociation. As of 2023, work is ongoing and includes APRIL issuing an “acknowledgement of harm” letter.

=== Fire and haze issues and management ===
In 2013, APRIL was named one of the eight companies responsible for sending hazardous level of smog to Singapore and Malaysia.

APRIL invests in fire prevention and suppression. The company invests more than $6 million in fire fighting equipment and maintains a 700-member rapid response team. In 2015, it pioneered the Fire-Free Village Programme, an incentive-based initiative that involves working at the community level to encourage alternatives to fire as a land management tool. Under this program, APRIL also conducts community education campaign, monitors air quality and even hires and trains people to be village crew leaders to spread "no-burn" message.

In 2016, APRIL became a founding member of the Fire Free Alliance, a voluntary multi-stakeholder platform for members to share information and resources to fight forest fires in Southeast Asia. One programme implemented by the Fire Free Alliance is the Fire-Free Village Programme. In May 2016 APRIL is one of private companies involved in Indonesian Government's pilot project to establish forest fire prevention procedures, through its subsidiary PT RAPP.
