= Verdigris Southern Railroad =

Railroad in Oklahoma

Overview
- Locale: Oklahoma
- Dates of operation: 2021–present

Technical
- Track gauge: 4 ft 8 1/2 in (1,435 mm) standard gauge
- Length: 3.3 miles (5.3 km)

Verdigris Southern Railroad, known as “VESO,” was initiated in 2021 to serve the Tulsa Port of Inola, one of the Tulsa Ports. VESO connects Port customers to the Union Pacific Railroad.

== History ==
Verdigris Southern Railroad, L.L.C. was created in Delaware on November 16, 2021, and then qualified to do business in Oklahoma. It is owned by Watco. VESO's purpose is to be a common carrier railroad to connect Tulsa Port of Inola businesses with an interchange with the Union Pacific at Inola, Oklahoma. Watco indicates the line is about 3.3 miles in length.

An abandoned rail line provided the trackage, which was rehabilitated for under $20 million. The project included funding from Port resident Sofidel and the United States Department of Transportation. The Port owns the trackage, which is then leased to VESO.

The line became operational in April 2024 with Sofidel, a tissue paper company, being the initial customer, and the primary commodity transported being raw pulp.
