= Tulsa Ports =

Ports in the United States serving Oklahoma

Coordinates: 36°13′27″N 95°44′11″W

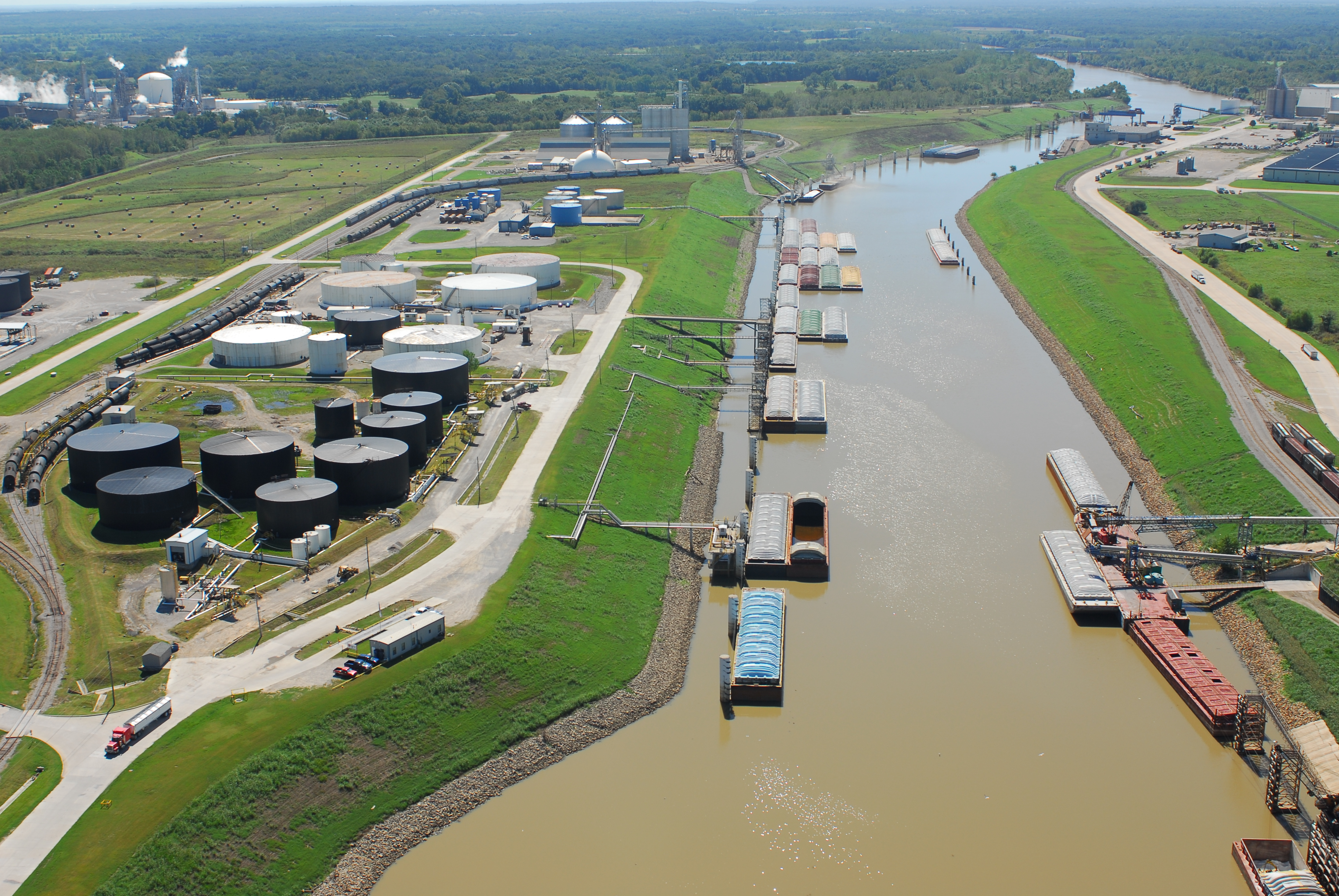
- Interactive map of Tulsa Ports

Location
- Country: United States
- Location: Rogers County, Oklahoma

Details
- Opened: January 1971
- Operated by: City of Tulsa - Rogers County Port Authority
- Type of harbour: Multi-modal
- Land area: 2500 acres
- Employees: approx. 3,000

Statistics
- Website http://tulsaport.com

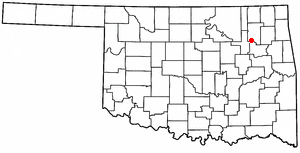
Location of the Tulsa Port of Catoosa

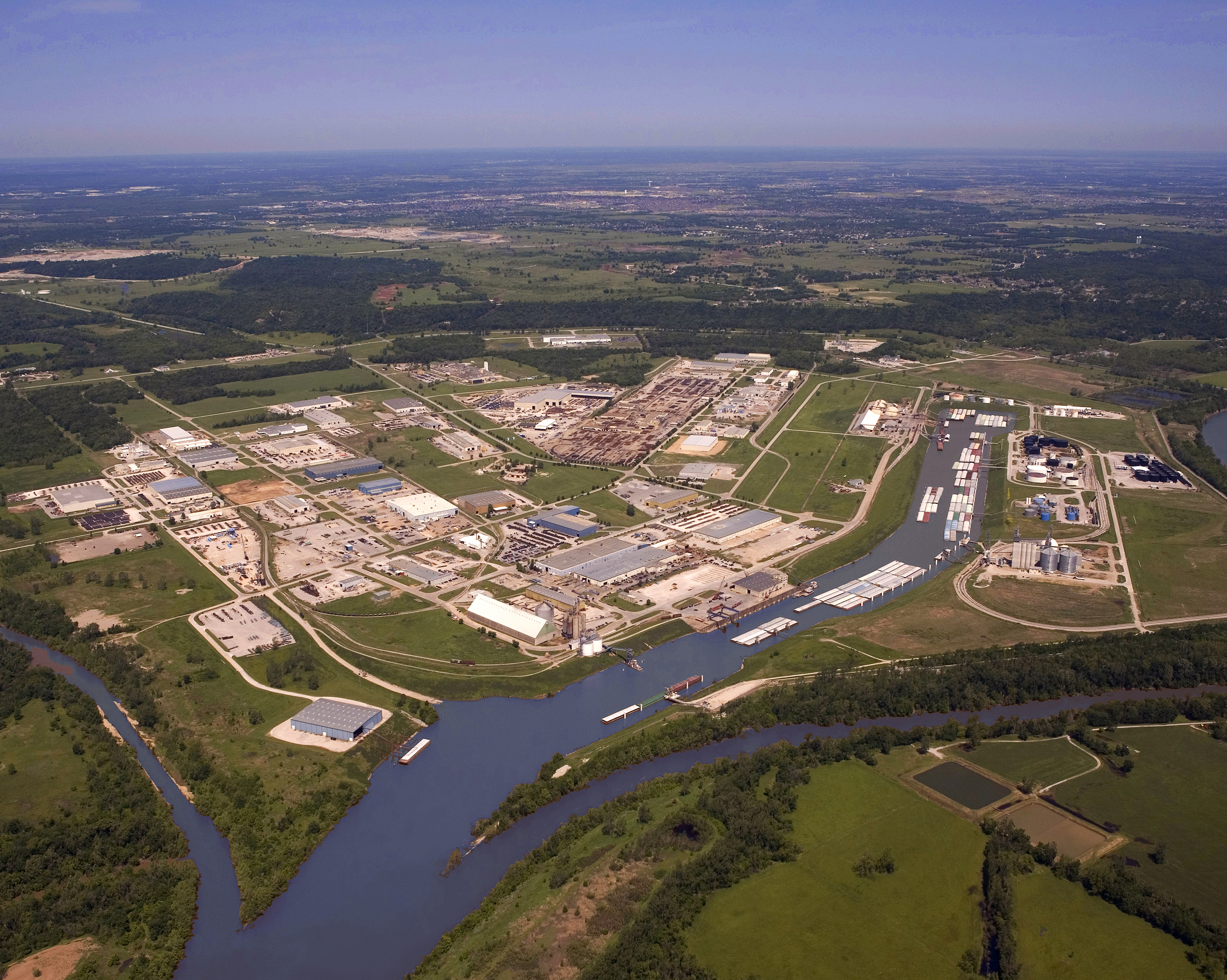
Aerial photo of the Tulsa Port of Catoosa taken May 5, 2008

The Tulsa Ports consist of the ports of Catoosa and Inola near Tulsa, Oklahoma, United States, on the Verdigris River, a tributary of the Arkansas and Mississippi Rivers. The ports are at and near the head of navigation for the McClellan-Kerr Arkansas River Navigation System. They enable year-round, ice-free barge service, with river flow levels controlled by the U.S. Army Corps of Engineers.

== Tulsa Port of Catoosa ==
The Tulsa Ports' primary facility is the Tulsa Port of Catoosa. It is near the city of Catoosa in Rogers County, just inside the municipal fenceline of Tulsa. It encompasses an area of 2,500 acres (10 km^{2}) and employs over 4,000 people at over 70 companies in its industrial park. The port ships manufactured goods and agricultural products from Oklahoma to the rest of the world. Designated a foreign trade zone, it is a major economic engine for the region, with over 2.7 million tons of cargo shipped through the port in 2013 alone.

=== History ===
The notion of making Tulsa a port city on the McClellan-Kerr Arkansas River Navigation System (MKARNS) evolved during the early 1960s, as the U.S. Army Corps of Engineers was constructing the massive waterway. A delegation of 23 Tulsa businesspeople travelled to Ohio to evaluate the impact of the effects of the Ohio River Valley navigation systems on regional business growth. They concluded that it would stimulate business in Oklahoma, and convinced other Tulsa business leaders to support the concept. The Metropolitan Tulsa Chamber of Commerce appointed Early Cass to chair a committee, thereafter known as the City of Tulsa–Rogers County Port Authority.

The port received its first commercial shipment in January 1971, It was officially opened for business on February 20, 1970, and was formally dedicated by President Richard M. Nixon on June 5, 1971. This port is the largest in Oklahoma. It is also one of the largest, farthest-inland river ports in the United States. It is located 8 miles (13 km) from the Tulsa International Airport and 15 miles (24 km) from downtown Tulsa. It is a fully equipped, multimodal transportation center served by both the BNSF Railroad and the South Kansas and Oklahoma Railroad. The port also provides rail switching services, known as the Port of Catoosa Industrial Railroad, using three dedicated, port-owned switch engines. The railroad's operation was turned over to OmniTRAX in August 2022.

In 1971, the first full year of operation, the port handled 86,654 tons of cargo. In 2013, it handled over 2.7 million tons. In addition to the many private terminals for grain, fertilizer, and break-bulk cargo located along the port channel, the port operates a 200-ton capacity overhead crane and a roll-on/roll-off dock.

In 2016, the port added a new 720-ft dock accommodating a rail line and multiple cranes.

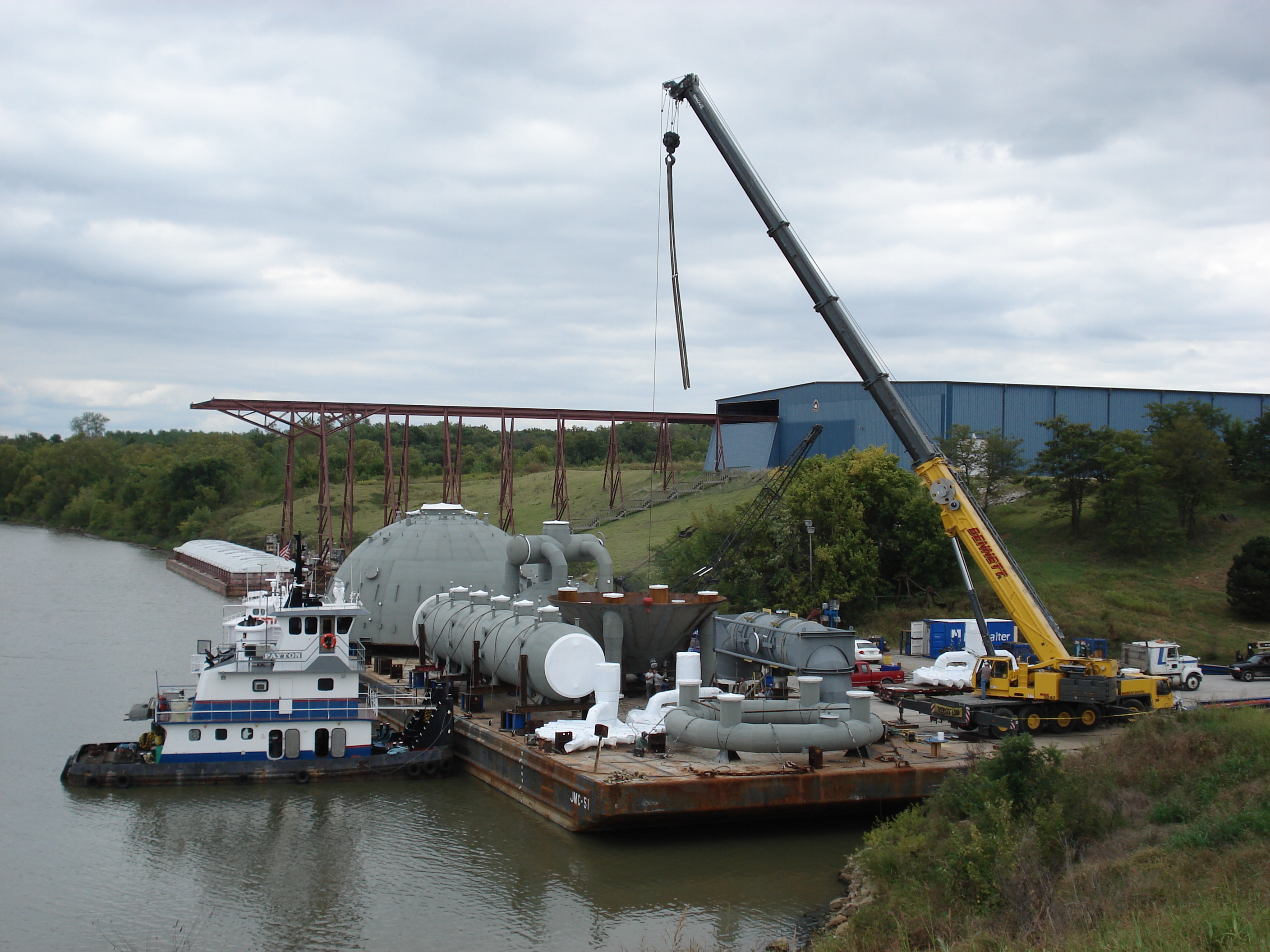
Low Water Wharf

In 2020, the Tulsa Port of Catoosa received a $1.1 million grant from the U.S. Department of Commerce's Economic Development Administration for railroad-crossing repairs, freight-rail infrastructure, and interchange improvements at the multimodal shipping complex and industrial park. On Thursday 24 September 2020, the Tulsa Port of Catoosa was rebranded to Tulsa Ports.

=== Facilities ===
The port has five public terminals that can transfer inbound and outbound bulk freight between barges, trucks, and railroad cars.

- Dry cargo terminals are owned by Tulsa Port of Catoosa. The dry break bulk cargo dock is operated by Tuloma Stevedoring, Inc. and primarily handles commodity iron and steel products. The dock is 720 feet (220 m) long with a 230-foot (70 m) wide concrete apron, and has various cranes and forklifts. It also features a 200-short-ton (180 t) overhead traveling bridge crane.
- Dry bulk freight terminal is a public terminal operated by Gavilon Fertilizer LLC, and which can handle materials ranging from pig iron to fertilizer. This terminal has two pedestal cranes and an outbound conveyor loading system. Both open and covered storage areas are available.
- Roll-on/Roll-off (RO - RO) low water wharf or "Project Cargo" is a public wharf operated by the Port Authority very large cargo (e.g. certain process equipment used in oil refineries. Often these cannot be shipped easily by truck or rail because of their weight or their overall dimensions. Sometimes these are shipped internationally by sea, and must be transferred to or from ocean-going vessels at the Port of Houston or the Port of New Orleans).
- Bulk liquids terminals handle such commodities as chemicals, asphalt, refined petroleum products and molasses. There are seven such terminals at the Port.

=== Recent tenants ===
The facility continues to grow. In February 2026, Mecad USA announced a 32,000 square foot manufacturing facility and headquarters at the Port estimated to cost $13.4 million and create 300 jobs.

== Tulsa Port of Inola ==
Tulsa Ports’ Inola facility, known as the Tulsa Port of Inola, is a 2,500 acre industrial park. It has rail access to the Union Pacific, as well as barge access to MKARNS.

The first tenant, Sofidel, built its 1.8 million square foot manufacturing facility there in 2020, incorporating both a paper mill producing raw paper from pulp, and a converting plant creating the finished product. Sofidel broke ground on a $775M, 1 million square foot expansion of its facility on June 4, 2026, with completion estimated to take two years.

In September 2022, Tulsa Ports received the largest grant in its history, being $22.3 million from the federal government, toward the $27.9 million cost of the Port of Inola Industrial Wastewater Treatment Plant. The plant lays the foundation for industrial facilities which could likely provide 10,000 future jobs.

In December 2022, the Port Authority announced a $15.76 million dollar rail project to rehabilitate existing track to connect the port and the Sofidel plant with the Union Pacific main line. The project included funding from Sofidel and the United States Department of Transportation. The resulting Verdigris Southern Railroad opened in April 2024.

Further upgrades are planned. As of December, 2023, an additional $150 million in infrastructure improvements were to be made to roads, water, and other utilities over the next two years.

On May 22, 2023, an Enel subsidiary announced the Tulsa Port of Inola as the future site of one of the largest solar cell and panel manufacturing plants in the U.S. Enel expected to invest over $1 billion in the 1.5 million square foot facility, creating 1,000 permanent jobs by 2025, with the possibility of creating another 900 in a second phase. Oklahoma officials called this the biggest economic development project in the state's history. However, as of May 2025, those plans remained on hold.

But an even larger development came about in May 2025, when a $4 billion aluminum plant was announced for the Port. Emirates Global Aluminium, a UAE company, said their facility would cover more than 350 acres at the Port, would produce billets and sheet ingots of high-purity aluminum and foundry alloys, and would be the largest such facility in the United States. U.S.-based Century Aluminum joined the project in January 2026 with a 40% stake. This will be the first primary aluminum plant (starting with raw alumina) to be constructed within the U.S. in almost five decades, and will likely foster barge traffic to the Port. In early February, 2026, Bechtel was selected for preliminary engineering. In late February, the parties behind the facility signed an agreement with an aluminum fabricator, U.S. Aluminum Company, to utilize the raw aluminum. This could result in that company building a facility at the port, and taking the aluminum in melted form to produce finished products. However, the entire project was called into question in June 2026 by a lawsuit from the Oklahoma Attorney General over possible environmental issues.
