= Axel Enström =

Axel Enström may refer to:

- Axel Enström (industrialist) (1893–1977), Swedish industrialist
- Axel Fredrik Enström (1875–1948), Swedish electrical engineer
