= Ulrika Francke =

Swedish politician

Ulrika Francke is a Swedish executive and former politician who was president of the International Organization for Standardization (ISO) between 2022 and 2023.

Francke studied at Stockholm University. She became the Vice Mayor of Stockholm as a Liberal Party politician between 1992 and 1999. During this time she was the city director of urban planning from 1992 to 1996 and the city director of streets and real estate from 1996 to 1999.

She spent 10 years as the CEO of Tyréns, a Swedish construction and civil engineering consultancy company, until 2017.

It was announced in November 2020 that Francke had been elected by ISO member bodies to serve as the organisation's president starting in January 2022, becoming the first woman to have ever held the role.

She was elected a fellow of the Royal Swedish Academy of Engineering Sciences in 1998.
