= TENA =

Swedish brand of incontinence products

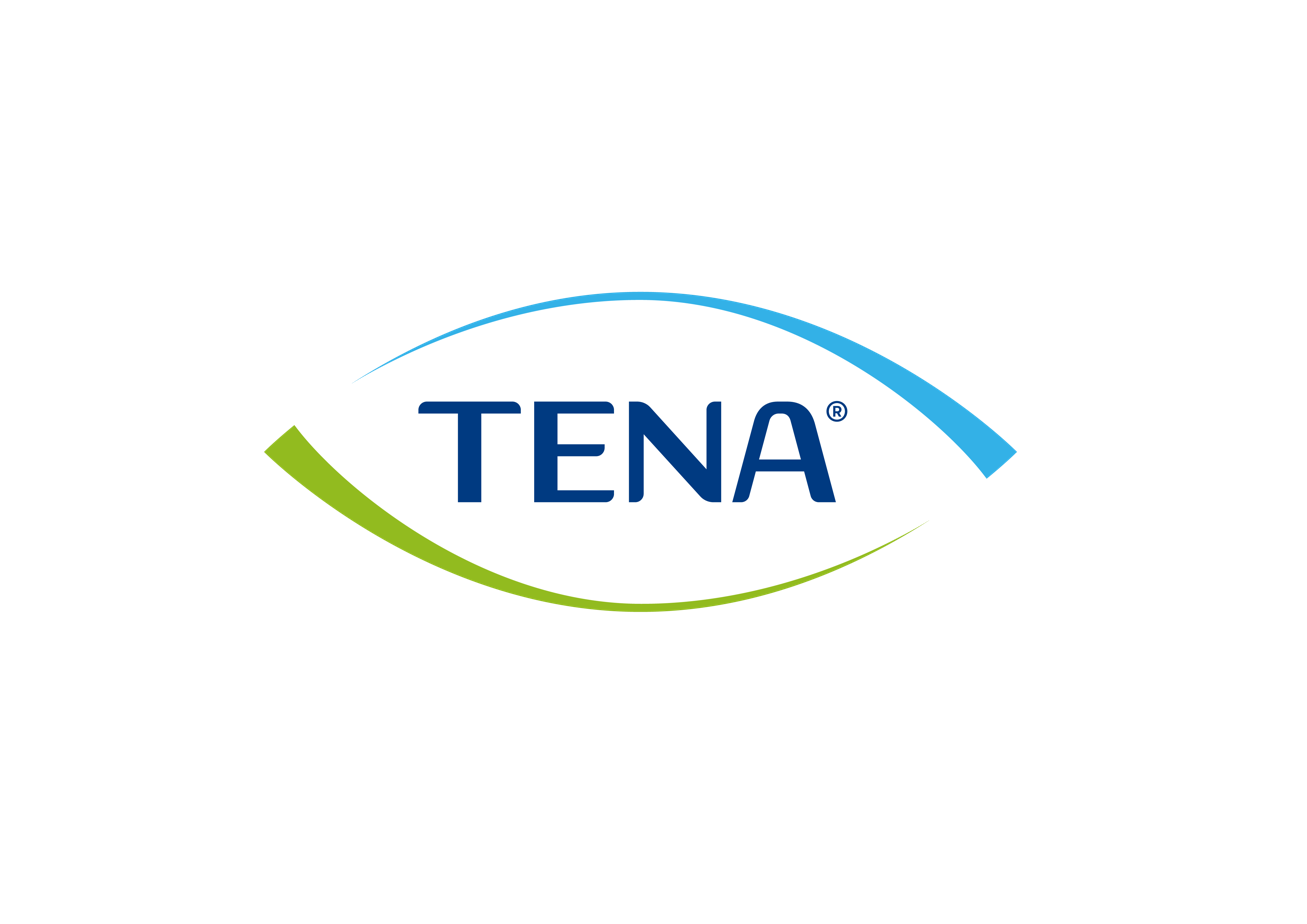
- Type: Subsidiary of Essity
- Industry: Incontinence products
- Founded: 1960; 66 years ago
- Headquarters: Stockholm, Sweden
- Products: Discreet Liners, Discreet Pads, Silhouette Underwear, ProSkin Pants
- Parent: SCA
- Website: www.tena.com

TENA is a Swedish-based brand of Essity that specializes in products for adults with urinary or fecal incontinence, such as pads and diapers. TENA also produces a youth diaper brand for teenagers and larger children. The company has offices in all of North America, most of Europe, in Australia and New Zealand, and some parts of Asia and Central America. TENA has specific lines for retail and health care. They can be found at grocery, drug and discount stores, in aisles where other bladder control products are sold.

== History ==
SCA, the parent company of Essity, which is the parent company of TENA, was founded in Sweden in 1929 by Ivar Kreuger as a paper packaging company. The company has produced personal hygiene products since the 1970s. The TENA brand was first used by the separate company Mölnlycke in the 1980s, then acquired by SCA in the early 1990s. In 1998, SCA Personal Care was created and took control of 25% of the world's share of incontinence products. The company's incontinence products branched off into another name called TENA later that year.

== See also ==
- Fecal incontinence
- Urinary incontinence
