= SABA (hygiene products) =

Norwegian hygiene product company

A/S SABA
- Type: Aksjeselskap
- Industry: Consumer goods
- Founded: 1945; 81 years ago in Tønsberg, Norway
- Successor: SABA Mölnlycke A/S; SCA Mölnlycke; SCA Hygiene Products; Essity
- Products: Feminine hygiene products, Diapers

A/S SABA, later SABA Mölnlycke A/S (1986–1996), was a Norwegian company that produced hygiene products such as menstrual pads, tampons, diapers, incontinence products and wet wipes. The company later became part of Sca Mölnlycke, Sca Hygiene Products, and Essity in turn; the name Saba is currently owned by Essity and used for a brand of feminine care products. The company was established in 1945 at Råel in the present-day Tønsberg Municipality in Vestfold county. For a time, Saba had several hundred employees and was considered a cornerstone company in the district.

In 1968, Saba was acquired by the Swedish industrial company Mölnlycke AB. In 1996, SCA (Svenska Cellulosa Aktiebolaget) acquired Mölnlycke, and with it Saba. SCA later spun off its hygiene products into the Essity brand in 2017. Production in Tønsberg ceased in 2002, and in 2007 the last employees moved from Tønsberg to the head office in Oslo.

== History ==
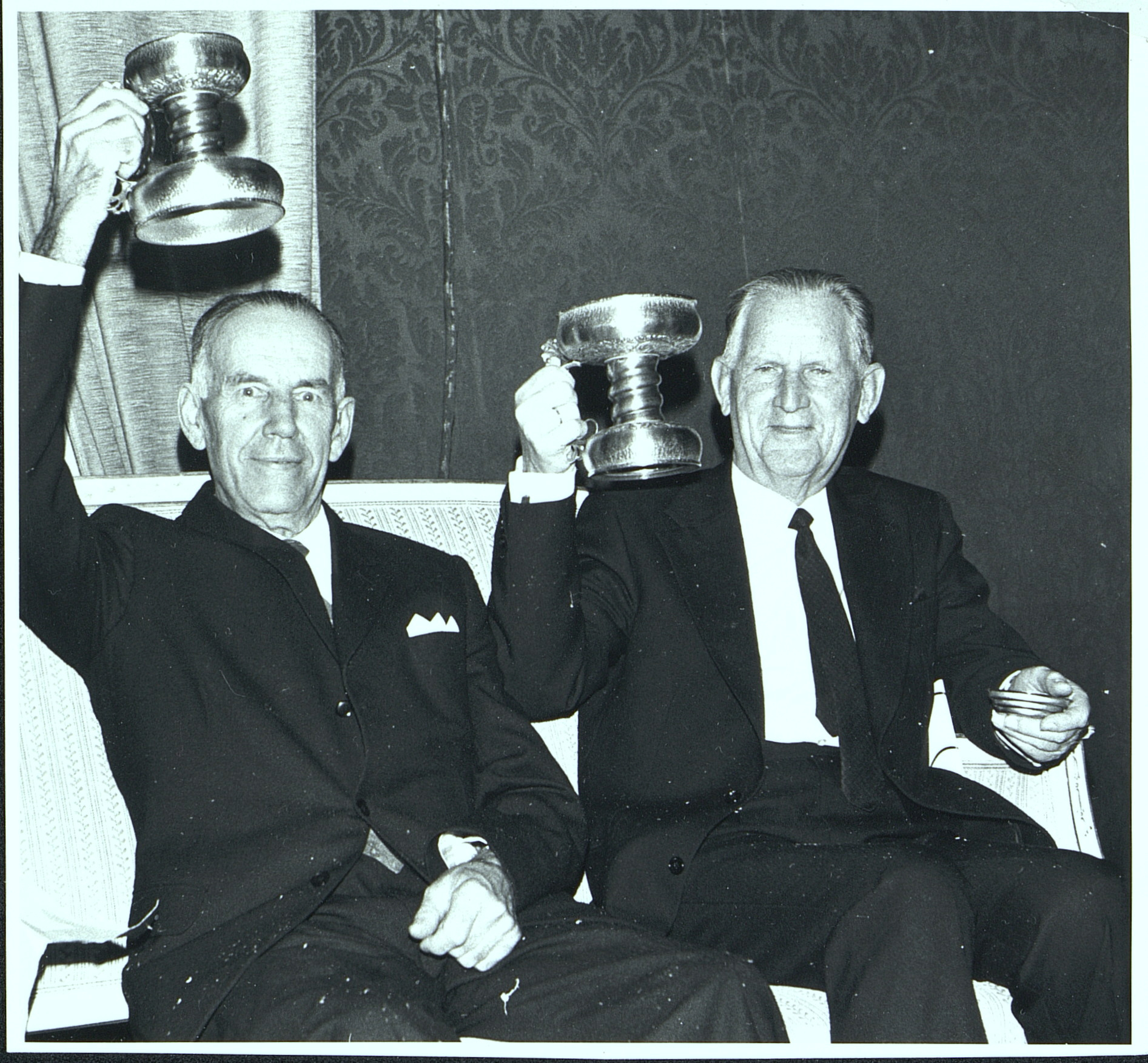
Arne Gravdahl and Gunnar Nissen Brager in 1975. The two established the Saba factory outside Tønsberg, Norway, in 1945. Production in Tønsberg ceased in 2002. Credit: Sca Mølnycke AS archive in Vestfoldmuseene's media archive

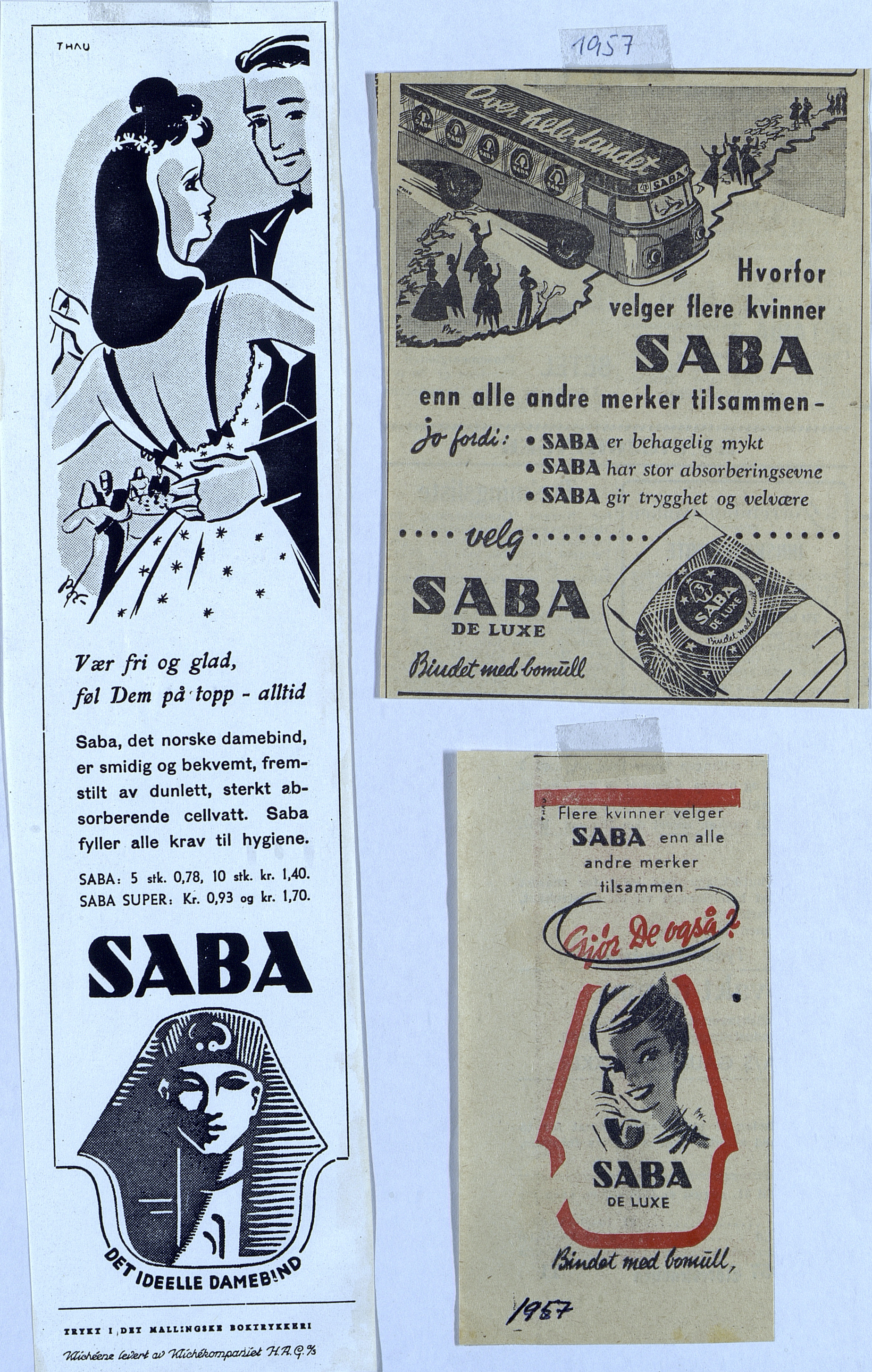
Newspaper advertisements from the 1950s for "SABA – the ideal feminine menstrual pad". The ad at the top also shows the colorful Saba bus, whose visible transport of feminine hygiene products was a public relations effort to dispel the taboo surrounding menstrual products. Credit: Vestfoldmuseene

In 1940, Arne Gravdahl, who ran a transport business and general store in Andebu Municipality, began producing modern menstrual pads. The first mass-produced menstrual pads came on the market around 1900, but disposable menstrual pads did not replace homemade cloths and improvised menstrual protection until the 1950s. Gravdahl and Olav Breian began their business in a garage in Øvre Råel in what was then Sem municipality, about 3 km (1.9 mi) outside the city. Five years later, Gravdahl and Gunnar Nissen Brager (1903–1988) from Røa in Oslo established the Saba factory in what had originally been a harpoon factory. In 1951, they began operations in a new building, but when it was destroyed by fire in 1952, a 1,000 m^{2} (11,000 sq ft) brick building with new machinery was constructed.

In 1968, the family business was acquired by its Swedish competitor Mölnlycke, a company based outside Gothenburg that was founded as a weaving mill in 1849. Saba had already entered into a partnership with Mölnlycke in 1960 for the exclusive right to sell the tampon brand o.b. in Norway. In 1962, a cooperative agreement was signed for the production and sale of diapers. In 1968 Saba became a subsidiary of the Swedish industrial company. Saba manufactured, marketed and sold Mölnlycke's products in Norway. Mölnlycke, in turn, was acquired by SCA in 1975.

From the late 1960s, operations at Saba were divided into divisions. In Tønsberg, there were four divisions in the 1980s: the consumer division (marketing), central administration (personnel and finance department), production, and engineering (development and construction of machinery). In Halden, technical and chemical products such as hair and skin care products, cleaning agents, adhesives and other products were manufactured.

The company's general manager in 1988 was Trygve Nagel-Johansen.

In 1996, SCA took over Mölnlycke and Saba. In 1999 SCA decided to split off the engineering division and sold it to the Italian company GDM, which makes machines for disposable diapers.

=== Products ===
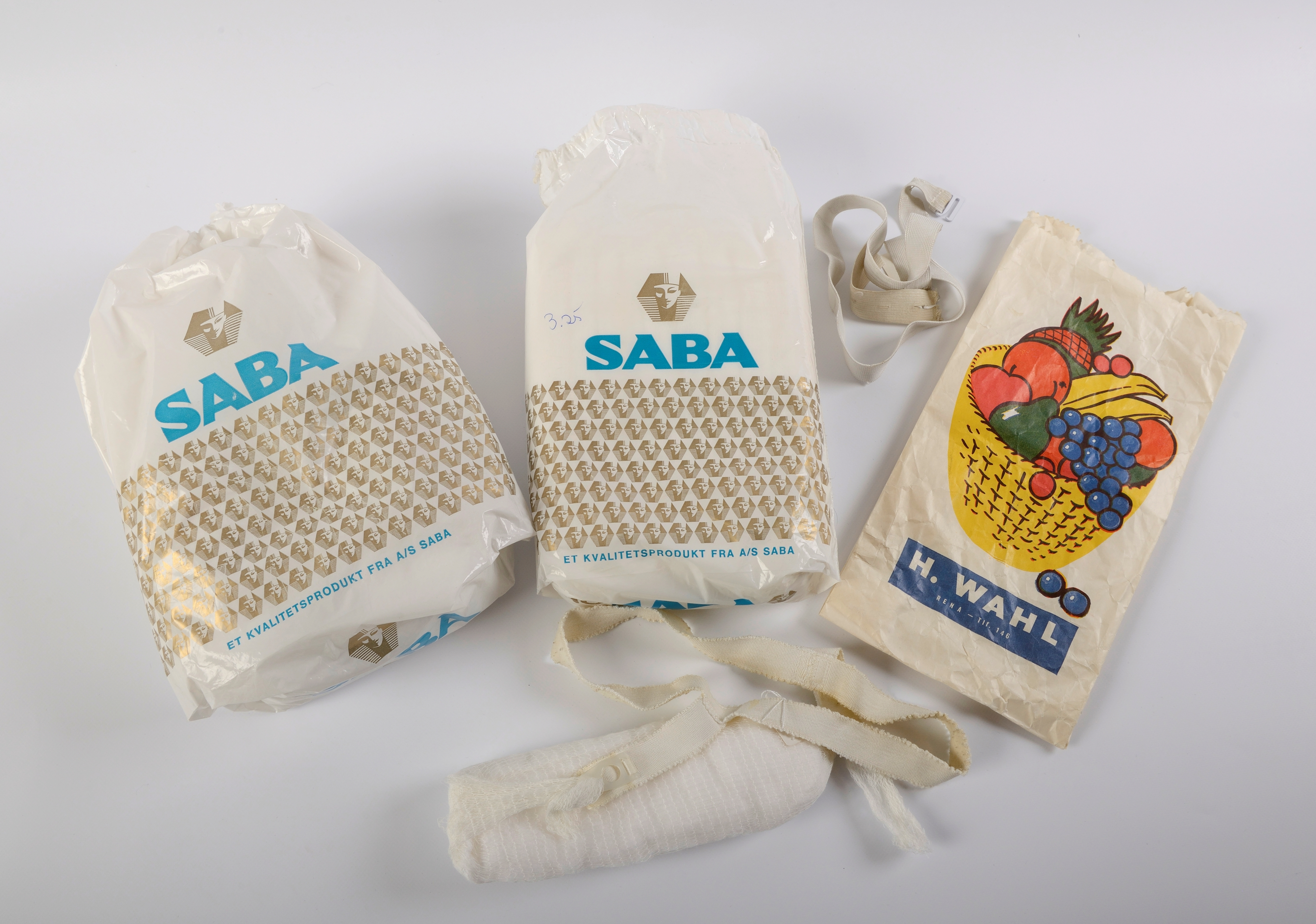
Menstrual pads from Saba, likely produced in the 1960s. The picture shows two unopened packages, a menstrual pad holder (belt) with and without the pad attached, and a neutral paper bag in which the pads were placed when sold in the shop. Credit: Geir Ove Andreassen, Anno Kvinnemuseet

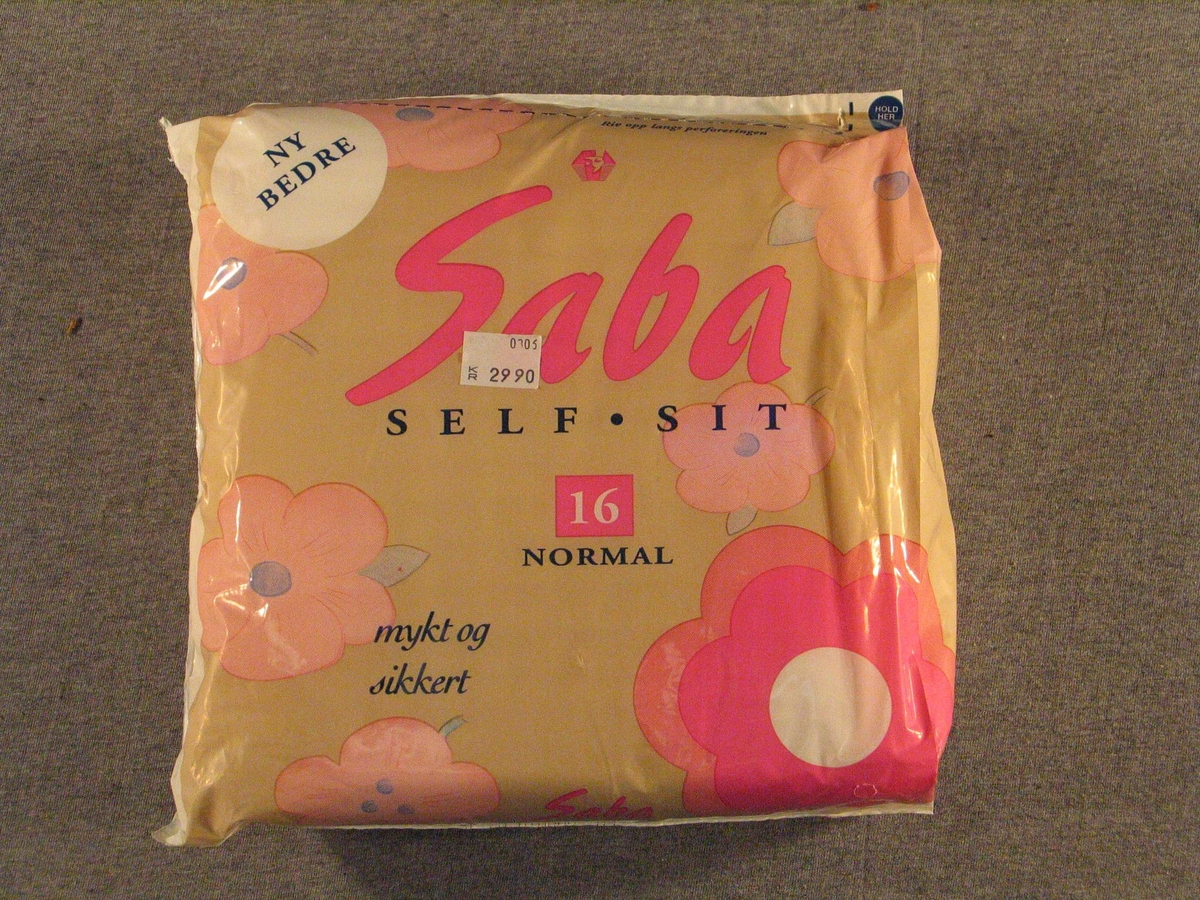
"Saba Self-Sit" from the 1990s. The pad has a layer of foam rubber to stay in place in tight-fitting underwear. Credit: Sunnfjord museum

In 1954, the Tønsberg factory developed the Saba de-Luxe – "the menstrual pad with cotton". It was a menstrual pad with defibrated cellulose and cotton and was significantly better than competitors' products. The innovations led to increased sales, from 400,000 10-packs in 1954 to about 4.5 million 10-packs in 1960, and the business grew with new products and larger facilities. Early disposable pads were used with a discreet belt or fastened with pins. Later came the Saba Self-Sit, pads that did not need to be fastened in place but which instead had a layer of foam rubber to stay in place in tight-fitting underwear. Other types of menstrual pads included thin pantyliners and thicker types for nighttime use.

Until the 1960s, menstruation was regarded as a highly private matter that was inappropriate to talk about in public. In the 1950s, feminine hygiene products were not usually displayed in shops, but instead sold discreetly under the counter. Some even tore off the labels and wrapped the products in grey paper. Saba's active marketing therefore attracted attention in many places, particularly through the traveling Saba bus, which made regular visits to paper, perfume and knitwear wholesalers in Eastern Norway. Originally the sale of tampons in Norway was forbidden for fear of health risks, but the law was repealed in the late 1950s. Until then, pads had mostly been sold in pharmacies and women's clothing stores, but they were becoming more familiar and commonly sold in Norwegian grocery stores.

The company's largest product in the early 1990s was children's diapers. Adult diapers and menstrual pads were also important, along with the construction of industrial machinery to make diapers, pads and other items.

=== Employees and revenue ===
In 1954 Saba employed 30 people at Råel, mostly women; in 1959, 60; and in 1961, 90. In 1970, it employed around 375 people and had a revenue of NOK 70 million. In 1979 the annual revenue was NOK 370 million, a threefold increase in six years. The company had 400 employees and its own wellness building with a sports center. In 1988, the company had 800 employees and a revenue of NOK 1.1 billion. In the early 1990s, 620 people worked in the Norwegian division of Saba Mølnlycke, of whom around 80 worked in sales and other areas at the Oslo office. The total revenue was NOK 1.3 billion a year. In 1995 there were 540 employees.

Saba Mølnlycke had a total revenue of NOK 21 billion and 21,315 employees in 1988.

Year	Total employees	Revenue
1954	30	
1959	60	
1961	90	
1970	Approx. 375	NOK 70M
1979	400	NOK 370M
1988	800	NOK 1.1B
ca. 1991	620	NOK 1.3B
1995	540	

== Essity ==
After Saba's sale to Mölnlycke and later SCA, the company would later become part of Essity as of 2017. It produces and sells diapers, incontinence products, and menstrual pads.

== Factory site ==
The Vallø and Narverød area of today's Tønsberg municipality was long dominated by textile production, an industry that provided many jobs for women. In addition to the wool spinning mill on Vallø (1783), there was a cotton spinning and weaving mill that was a major employer until around 1870. Later came Brager konfeksjonsfabrikk A/S, which in 1960 had 100 employees, A/S Saba (Sca Mølnlycke AS) and Ryla tekstil.

Since the closure of the business at Råel, the old office and factory premises have been rented out as offices and storage for businesses and private individuals. The Saba building, also called the BASA building by its owners, was damaged by fire in summer 2015.

== Sponsorship ==
Saba Mölnlycke was the sponsor for the Norwegian women's national football team when the Nordic Championship was held in Norway in 1979. The company continued its support in the 1980s when the series for Norwegian women's football was named the Saba Series.
