= Axel Enström (industrialist) =

Swedish industrialist (1893–1978)

Axel Gustaf Torbjörn Enström
- Enström in 1974
- Born: October 25, 1893; Kalix, Sweden
- Died: March 9, 1977 (aged 83); Sundsvall, Sweden
- Employer: Svenska Cellulosa AB
- Title: President; Chairman of the Board
- Spouse: Margit Lisa Magdalena Wahlberg (m. 1920–1977)
- Children: Torbjörn Enström (1921-1983); Stig Ove Lennart Enström (1923-1999); Birgitta Enström (1925- )

Axel Gustaf Torbjörn Enström (October 25, 1893 - March 9, 1977) was the head of Svenska Cellulosa Aktiebolaget in Sundsvall. He was managing director from 1950 to 1960 and chairman of the board from 1960 to 1965.

== Biography ==
He was born on October 25, 1893, in Sweden.

He married Margit Lisa Magdalena Wahlberg (1900-1984) in Ytterlännäs, Västernorrland, Sweden on July 18, 1920. She was a daughter of Johanna Winblad (1859-1916) and Per Olof Bernhard Wahlberg (1852-1927). Their children include: Torbjörn Enström (1921-1983) who married Genenieve Shaw; Lennart Enström (1923-1999) who married Inga Lisa Bergengren; and Birgitta Enström (1925- ) who married Rickard Jörgen Ryott Malmros (1924-2006).

He was managing director of Svenska Cellulosa Aktiebolaget from 1950 to 1960.

On September 12, 1953, the golf course he created in Sundsvall was opened. The course was officially opened by His Royal Highness Prince Bertil. The SCA Men's Choir was established on August 28, 1957, on his initiative. His interest in male choral singing lead to the creation of choirs wherever there was an SCA run company, in Kramfors, Holmsund, Byske and Karlsvik. An icebreaking tugboat that belonged to SCA was named after him. It was later sold and renamed "Fram".

In 1953, he was elected a member of the Royal Swedish Academy of Engineering Sciences.

He was chairman of the board of Svenska Cellulosa Aktiebolaget from 1960 to 1965. He retired in 1965 and died on March 9, 1977, in Sweden.

== Publications ==
- Skogsbrukets och jordbrukets rationalisering - synpunkter på hur denna ... (1953)

== Awards and decorations ==
- (Sweden) Commander Grand Cross of the Order of the Polar Star (6 June 1963)
