= Essity =

Global hygiene and health company

Essity AB
- Type: Aktiebolag
- Traded as: Nasdaq Stockholm: ESSITY A, ESSITY B
- ISIN: SE0009922156; SE0009922164
- Industry: Consumer goods
- Predecessor: SCA
- Founded: June 15, 2017; 9 years ago
- Headquarters: Stockholm, Sweden
- Area served: Worldwide
- Key people: Jan Gurander (Chairman) Ulrika Kolsrud (CEO)
- Products: Consumer Goods, Health & Medical, Professional Hygiene
- Revenue: SEKm 147,147 (2023)
- Operating income: SEKm 16,607 (2023)
- Total assets: SEKm 202,993 (2023)
- Total equity: SEKm 79,405 (2023)
- Number of employees: 36,000 (2023)

Essity AB (commonly known as Essity) is a Swedish multinational company specializing in hygiene and health products headquartered in Stockholm, Sweden. Established in 2017 through a spin-off from the forest products company Svenska Cellulosa Aktiebolaget (SCA), Essity operates in approximately 150 countries and serves more than one billion people worldwide with its range of products Essity's name is derived from the words "essentials" and "necessity," reflecting its focus on essential hygiene and health products.

Essity's range of products includes personal care items, consumer tissue products, professional hygiene solutions, and medical care goods. The company is known for its well-established brands like TENA, Tork, and Libero. Its products are designed for single use and include items like tissue paper, baby diapers, feminine care (menstruation pads, etc.), incontinence products, compression therapy, orthopedics and wound care.

Essity has approximately 36,000 employees and net sales in 2023 amounted to EUR 13 billion.

== History ==
Essity was formerly a part of the SCA group.

SCA was founded in 1929 as a forestry company. In 1975, SCA acquired Mölnlycke AB, a western European producer of disposable hygiene products.

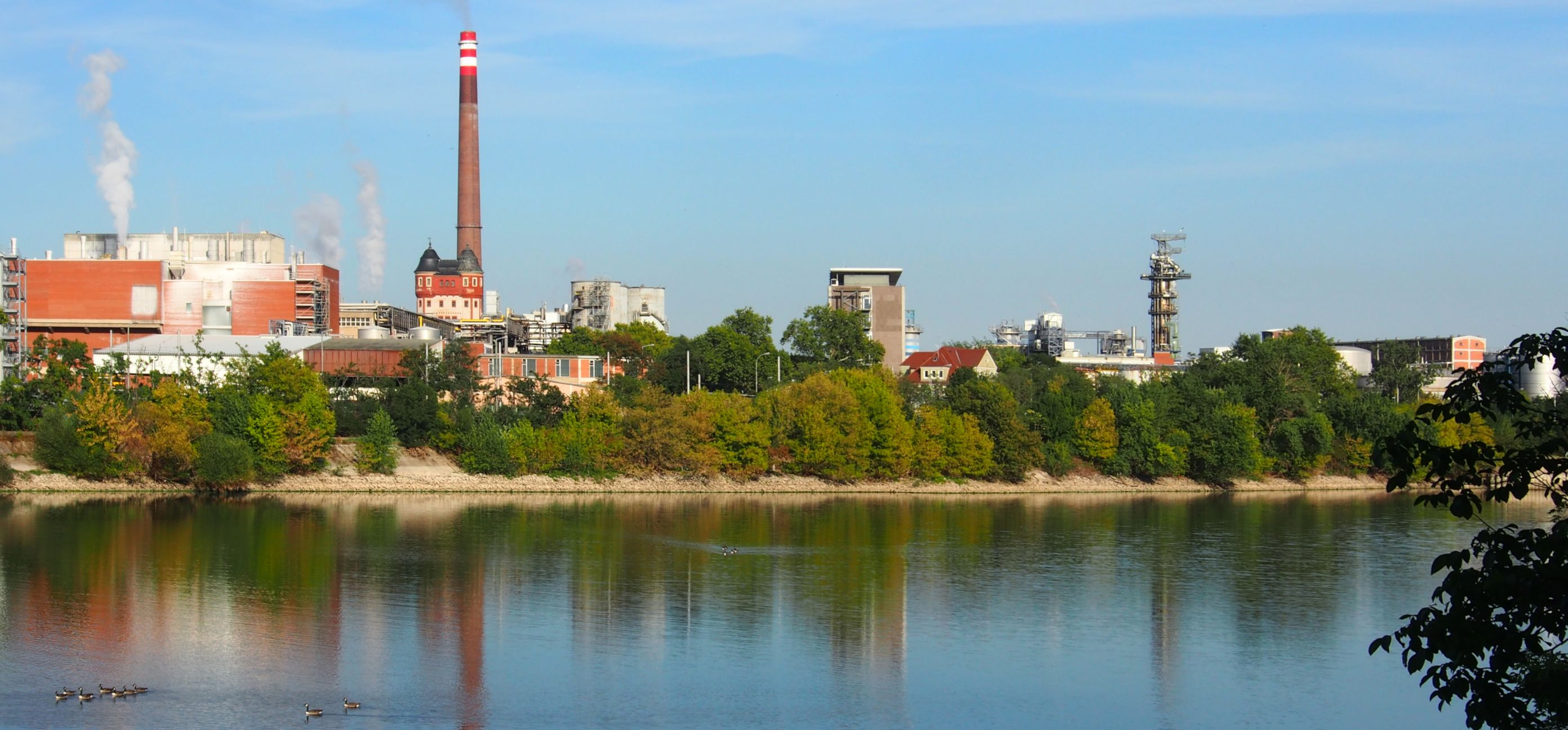
Zellstofffabrik Waldhof in Mannheim, origin of PWA and the Zewa brand

In 1995 they acquired the German paper and packaging company PWA, Papierwerke Waldhof-Aschaffenburg.

In 2001 the division Wisconsin Tissue of the United States company Georgia-Pacific Tissue was acquired.

In 2004 SCA acquired the tissue and hygiene products businesses of Carter Holt Harvey from International Paper.

In 2007, Procter & Gamble sold their European tissue business to SCA for €512 million ($672 million).

In 2007 SCA acquired its first minority share in the Asian tissue company Vinda.

In 2011, it acquired the Brazilian Pro Descart for about R$114 million, with local brands Biofral and Drybaby. Later, it invested R$242 million in a plant in Jarinu, in the interior of São Paulo, consolidating the brands TENA and Tork.

In July 2012, the acquisition of Georgia Pacific's tissue operations, including the brand Lotus, was closed. The total price amounted to €1.32 billion.

In 2013 SCA became majority shareholder in Vinda.

In 2015, SCA was the largest producer of tissue paper in the world.

In August 2015 it was announced that SCA's hygiene operations and forestry operations were to be divided into two different divisions. A year later, 24 August 2016, the company announced that it intended to split the SCA into two separately listed companies. In December 2016 SCA announced the acquisition of BSN Medical, a company specializing in the areas of Compression Therapy, Wound Care and Orthopaedics. The purchase price amounted to €2740 million and included brands such as Jobst, Leukoplast, Cutimed, Delta Cast and Actimove. In 2017, SCA split off Essity as a separate company, and Essity listed on the Stock Exchange in Stockholm on June 15, 2017.

At the General Annual Meeting 2024 Essity appointed Jan Gurander as new Chairman.

May 9, 2025 Essity's Board of Directors appointed Ulrika Kolsrud as new President and CEO

In November 2025, it was announced Essity had entered into an agreement to acquire Edgewell Personal Care’s feminine care business, for $340m on a cash and debt-free basis.

== Brands ==
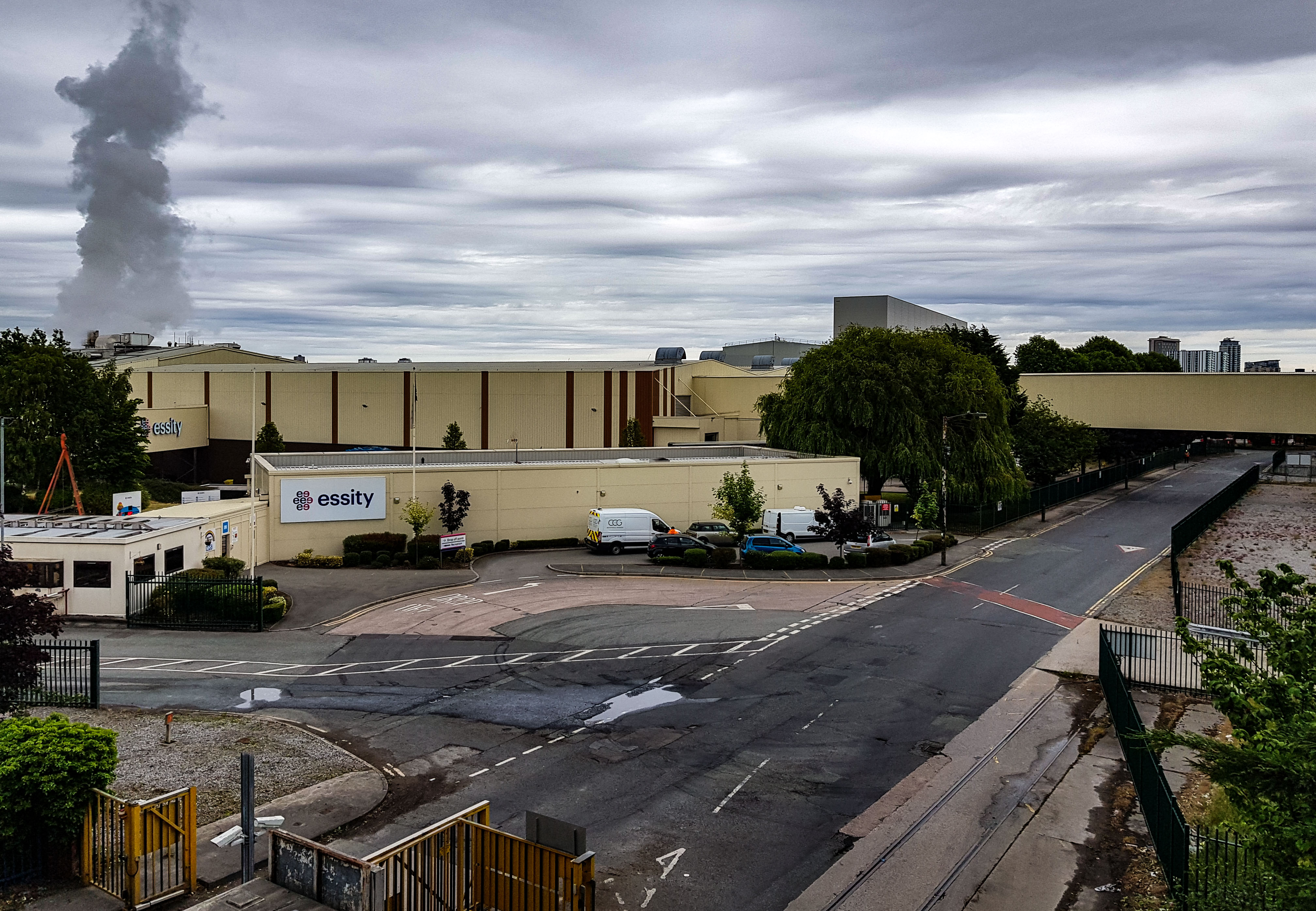
Premises in Manchester, UK

- Actimed
- Cushelle
- Cutimed
- Demak Up
- Delta Cast
- Familia (Latin America)
- feh (Austria)
- Hydrofera
- JOBST
- Leukoplast
- Libero
- Libresse
- Lotus
- Nosotras (Latin America)
- Okay (France and Benelux)
- Plenty
- Purex (New Zealand)
- Regio (Mexico)
- Saba, from a company of the same name which became part of Essity
- Tempo
- TENA
- TOM Organic
- Tork
- Zewa

== Competitors ==
Essity is amongst the top 50 largest fast-moving consumer goods companies in the world and some of its competitors are Unilever, Procter & Gamble, Georgia-Pacific, Kimberly-Clark, Sofidel, Unicharm, Ontex, CMPC, Santher and 3M.

== Sustainability messaging ==
Several initiatives have been launched to influence messaging around the sustainability of the Essity business model:

- A science-based target for emissions reduction in line with climate science was approved in 2018.
- The company has qualified for inclusion in both the Dow Jones Sustainability World Index and Sustainability Europe Index, and has also been named industry leader in the household products sector.
- Company representatives participate in the Ellen MacArthur Foundation's "New Plastics Economy" initiative and have committed to sustainability targets for packaging, for example that 85% of the company's packaging is to be manufactured from renewable or recycled material by 2025.

== Criticism ==
Along with its supplier SCA, Essity was accused by Greenpeace of promoting unsustainable business practices aggravating global warming and mass extinction. Greenpeace claim that Essity "clearcuts some of Sweden's last remaining old-growth forests, wiping away habitats of threatened species and endangering the livelihood of indigenous communities".

In late August 2022, Essity announced their intention to sue lockedout striking workers at a paper-mill in Kawerau, New Zealand, for ~NZ$580,000 because they began their strike an hour earlier than stated. The strike began in early August over a pay dispute, and involved 145 workers.

On June 10, 2023 Essity announced that it would leave the Russian market.
