= Obbola =

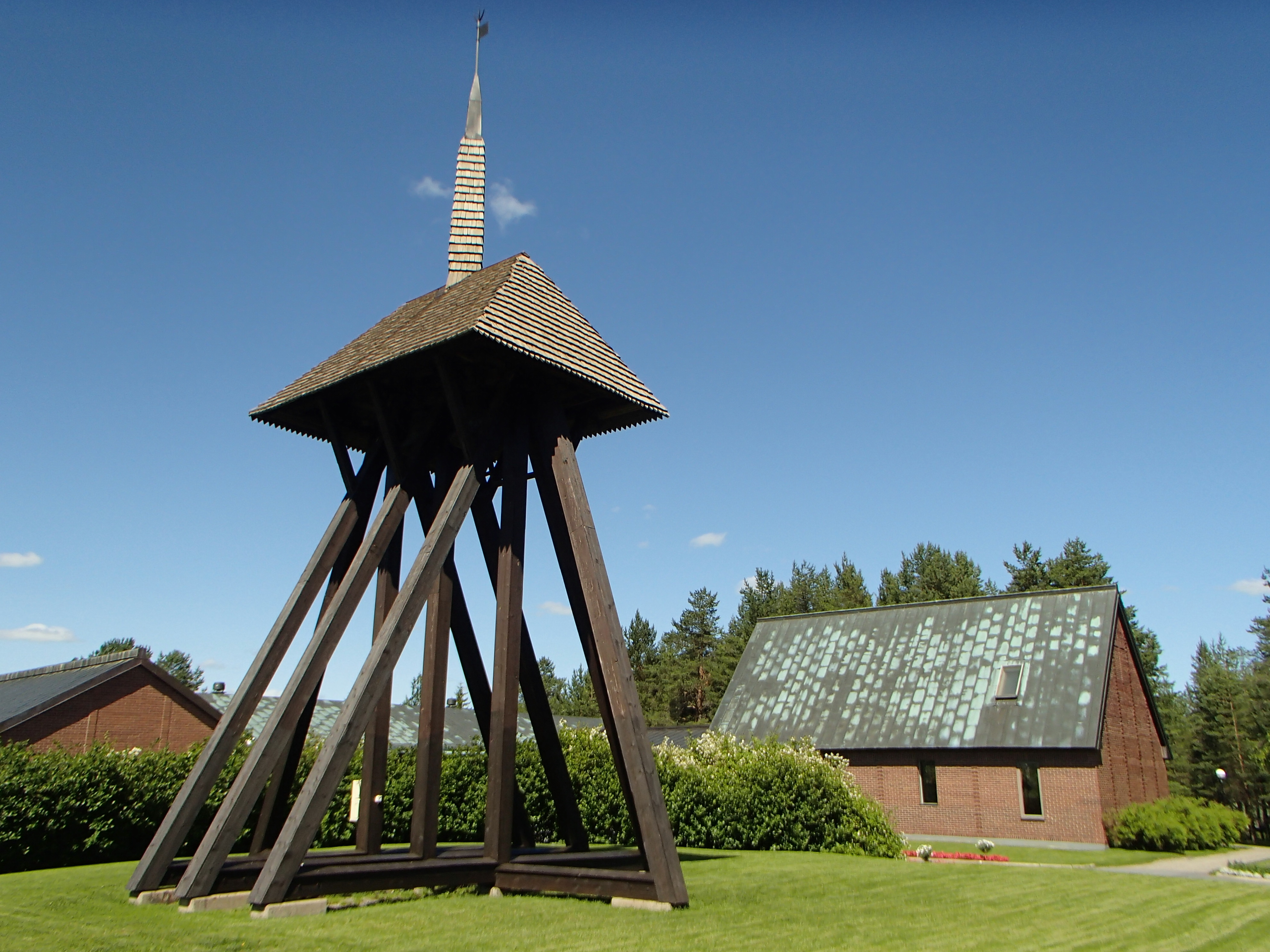
- Obbola Church

- Location within Västerbotten Location within Sweden
- Coordinates: 63°42′N 20°19′E
- Country: Sweden
- Province: Västerbotten
- County: Västerbotten County
- Municipality: Umeå Municipality

Area
  - Total: 2.56 km^{2} (0.99 sq mi)

Population (31 December 2010)
  - Total: 2,197
  - Density: 858/km^{2} (2,220/sq mi)
- Time zone: UTC+1 (CET)
  - Summer (DST): UTC+2 (CEST)

Obbola is a locality situated in Umeå Municipality, Västerbotten County, Sweden with 2,197 inhabitants in 2010. It is located close to the town of Holmsund. Obbola lies to the west of the mouth of Ume River at the Gulf of Bothnia in the Baltic Sea. SCA is the biggest employer in the locality. In the school in Obbola there are pupils from grade one to grade nine. After that most of the pupils continue in the city of Umeå.

Obbola is connected to nearby Holmsund by the Obbola Bridge which carries the E12 road over the river estuary.

Obbola is also the home of the famous local writer, Lillemor Thurén Enkvist (1842-1900)
