= Obbola Bridge =

Road bridge in Sweden

Coordinates: 63.7111°N 20.3392°E

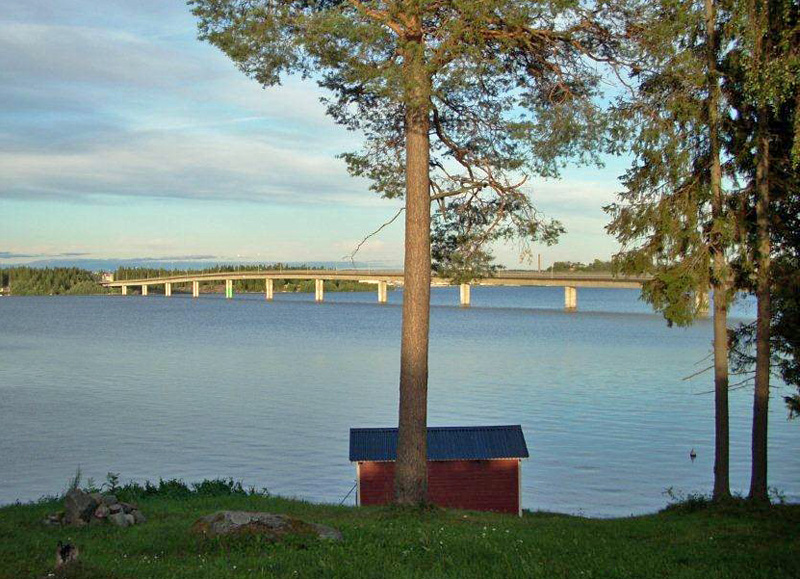

Obbola bridge (Swedish: Obbolabron) is a road bridge on the E12 over Österfjärden that connects Obbola and Holmsund in Sweden. The bridge was built during the winter of 1988 when an artificial freezing process was used to create a stable work platform for the heavy pile driving equipment.
