= Mölnlycke Health Care =

Swedish medical device company

- Type: Aktiebolag
- Industry: Medical devices
- Founded: 1849 (177 years ago)
- Headquarters: GoCo Innovation City, Mölndal, Sweden
- Key people: Zlatko Rihter, CEO
- Revenue: € 856 million (2009)
- Owner: Investor AB (96%)
- Number of employees: 8,617 (December 2024)
- Website: www.molnlycke.com

Mölnlycke Health Care is a Swedish medical device company headquartered in Mölndal and active internationally. The company manufactures and sells wound care, single-use surgical products, surgical gloves and antiseptics. Mölnlycke Health Care is a service provider to the healthcare sector. The surgical division includes medical devices such as drapes, gowns, facemasks, and headwear. The wound care division includes dressings, compression products and skin care products and emollients.

== History, mergers and acquisitions ==
The company was founded in 1849 by Gustaf Ferdinand Hennig in Mölnlycke as a textile manufacturer. In the 1940s Mölnlycke began supplying the health care industry with products, such as gauze.

1968 Mölnlycke AB acquired Norwegian hygiene product company SABA.

1975 Mölnlycke AB was acquired by Svenska Cellulosa Aktiebolaget (SCA) (publ) where it made up their Clinical division. At that time SCA was known as Bowater-Scott, and the new company, called Sancella Pty Limited, manufactured personal care products.

1997 SCA sold the Clinical products division to Nordic Capital who merged it with Kolmi-Set acquired by Tamro and named it Mölnlycke Health Care AB. Mölnlycke Health Care started operations as an independent company in 1998.

2001, Mölnlycke Health Care acquired the single-use surgical BARRIER product line from Johnson & Johnson.

2005 Mölnlycke Health Care AB was acquired from Nordic Capital by Apax Partners in June 2005 and subsequently merged with Medlock Medical and Regent Medical. The merged company became Mölnlycke Health Care Group.

2007 Apax Partners sold Mölnlycke Health Care Group to Investor AB and Morgan Stanley in January 2007.

2008 Mölnlycke Health Care acquired Pharmaset in October 2008, a French manufacturer of surgical single-use kits.

2009 The company acquired JKT, a Polish manufacturer of surgical disposable products.

2010 The company acquired Rynel, Inc. in January 2010, an American manufacturer of hydrophilic polyurethane foam.

- Investor AB acquired Morgan Stanley Principal Investments' stake in Mölnlycke Health Care in August 2010. The acquisition made Investor AB a 96% owner in the company. The remaining 4% is owned by management.

2011 The company launched the construction of a new manufacturing facility at Brunswick Landing in June 2011, site of the former Naval Air Station Brunswick, in Brunswick, Maine, United States, representing a significant milestone for the company to become a leading health care product manufacturer in the world. The factory will produce health care products for U.S market from 2012, and significantly reduce the manufacturing cost and assist new product development.

2012 The company acquires assets of Brennen Medical (St. Paul, Minnesota) associated with their business in Burn and Wound Care.

- The company acquires WoundEL from Gerromed GmbH.
- Mölnlycke Health Care establishes the subsidiary Mölnlycke Health Care Scotland Ltd.

2013 The company signed a licence agreement with Covalon Technologies.

2014 The company announced its expansion plans for its Wiscasset, Maine, manufacturing facility in January 2014.

2020 CEO Richard Twomey announced his departure after six years with the organization.

== Sales and manufacturing ==
Mölnlycke Health Care has sales offices globally. The company has split their production between several factories around the world. Production of their surgical products takes place in Belgium, Thailand, Malaysia, France, Poland and the Czech Republic. Production of wound care products takes place in the UK, Finland and U.S.

== Labor relations in Thailand operation ==
Twenty-three founders and leaders of the Mölnlycke Health Care Labour Union at the company's plant in Thailand were allegedly dismissed in 2001 due to their involvement in trade union activities. The Industrial Relations Committee (IRC) of Thailand deemed the dismissal to be unfair and suggested the company reinstate the workers. At a later stage, two workers were reinstated, one of whom was elected as union president. In 2011 22 workers were dismissed in the aftermath of what the company claims to be wild strikes, which again the IRC of Thailand deemed to be unfair. Still claiming this to be wild strikes, Mölnlycke appealed to the Labour Court for legal trial as either party in an IRC mediation has the right to appeal IRC's recommendation to the court system. The case was settled out of court in February 2013.

== Labor environment in the Czech Republic ==
Mölnlycke's Czech Republic plant based in Karviná was highlighted for physical breakdowns of some female employees. For example, on August 5, 2014, three female workers (ages 39, 40 and 52) were taken from the production hall to a local hospital by ambulance.
