= Libresse =

Feminine hygiene brand

- Product type: Feminine hygiene
- Current owner: Essity
- Country: Stockholm, Sweden
- Introduced: 1940s
- Markets: Worldwide
- Website: libresse.com

Libresse is a Swedish brand specializing in products for period and daily intimate care. It is a global brand that operates under different names in local markets: Bodyform, Nana, Nuvenia, Saba, Nosotras, Libresse, and Libra.

In November 2025, it was announced that Libresse was one of the assets acquired by Essity (formerly SCA). Founded in 1929 by Ivar Kreuger as a paper packaging company, Essity is a Swedish health and hygiene firm that conducts sales in approximately 150 countries.

== Products ==
Libresse creates a range of products to support period and daily intimate care, from pads, liners, washes, wipes, menstrual cups and period pants. Their products provide protection across a range of flows, fits and needs.

== Marketing ==
Since 2017, Libresse has made a name for itself with its taboo-busting advertising campaigns on topics surrounding women's bodies and health. The brand often uses creativity to subvert shame and break down stigma, in line with their purpose. Given that these campaigns push boundaries and contain intimate moments, several have caused some controversy at launch.
