= Holmsund =

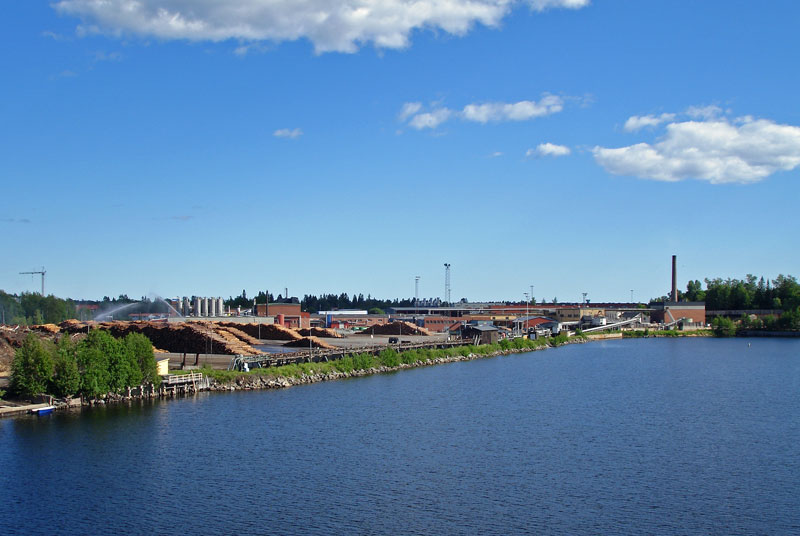
- The Holmsund sawmill in 2012

- Location within Västerbotten Location within Sweden
- Coordinates: 63°42′30″N 20°22′10″E
- Country: Sweden
- Province: Västerbotten
- County: Västerbotten County
- Municipality: Umeå Municipality

Area
  - Total: 5.48 km^{2} (2.12 sq mi)

Population (31 December 2010)
  - Total: 5,489
  - Density: 1,001/km^{2} (2,590/sq mi)
- Time zone: UTC+1 (CET)
  - Summer (DST): UTC+2 (CEST)

Holmsund is a locality situated in Umeå Municipality, Västerbotten County, Sweden with 5,489 inhabitants in 2010. It is located 18 km south of the city of Umeå and serves as a port for Umeå.

== Position ==
Holmsund lies at the mouth of the Ume River. To the west, across the river estuary, is a town called Obbola, the towns are connected by the E12 road which is carried over the river estuary by the Obbola Bridge. Both Holmsund and Obbola have wood and paper industries. From the southern end of Holmsund a ferry service runs to the Finnish port of Vaasa.

== History ==
Swedish water-powered sawmills were under threat when steam power was introduced to Sweden in 1849. The largest Swedish water-powered saw mill was at Baggböle. It was one of the last to close in 1884 when Holmsund built a steam-powered mill. Swedish sawn timber became a major export.

== Notable residents ==
=== Sports people ===
- Thommy Abrahamsson ice hockey player, born in Holmsund
- Christer Abris ice hockey player, born in Holmsund
- Hjalmar Bergström skier, born in Holmsund
- Kent Forsberg ice hockey trainer, born in Holmsund.
- Gus Forslund ice hockey player, born in Holmsund.
- Elon Sundström ice hockey player, born in Holmsund
- Kay Wiestål football player, born in Holmsund

=== Others ===
- Fredrik Burgman, journalist
- Kjell-Olof Feldt, politician (s), born in Holmsund.
- Lisa Miskovsky, musician, born in Holmsund
- Frida Selander musician, raised in Holmsund
- Kristofer Steen, guitarist, born in Holmsund
- Thure Jadestig politician (s), born in Holmsund
- Kurt Ove Johansson politician (s), raised in Holmsund
- Eva-Lena Lundgren Fröken Sverige, born in Holmsund

== Holmsund in pictures ==
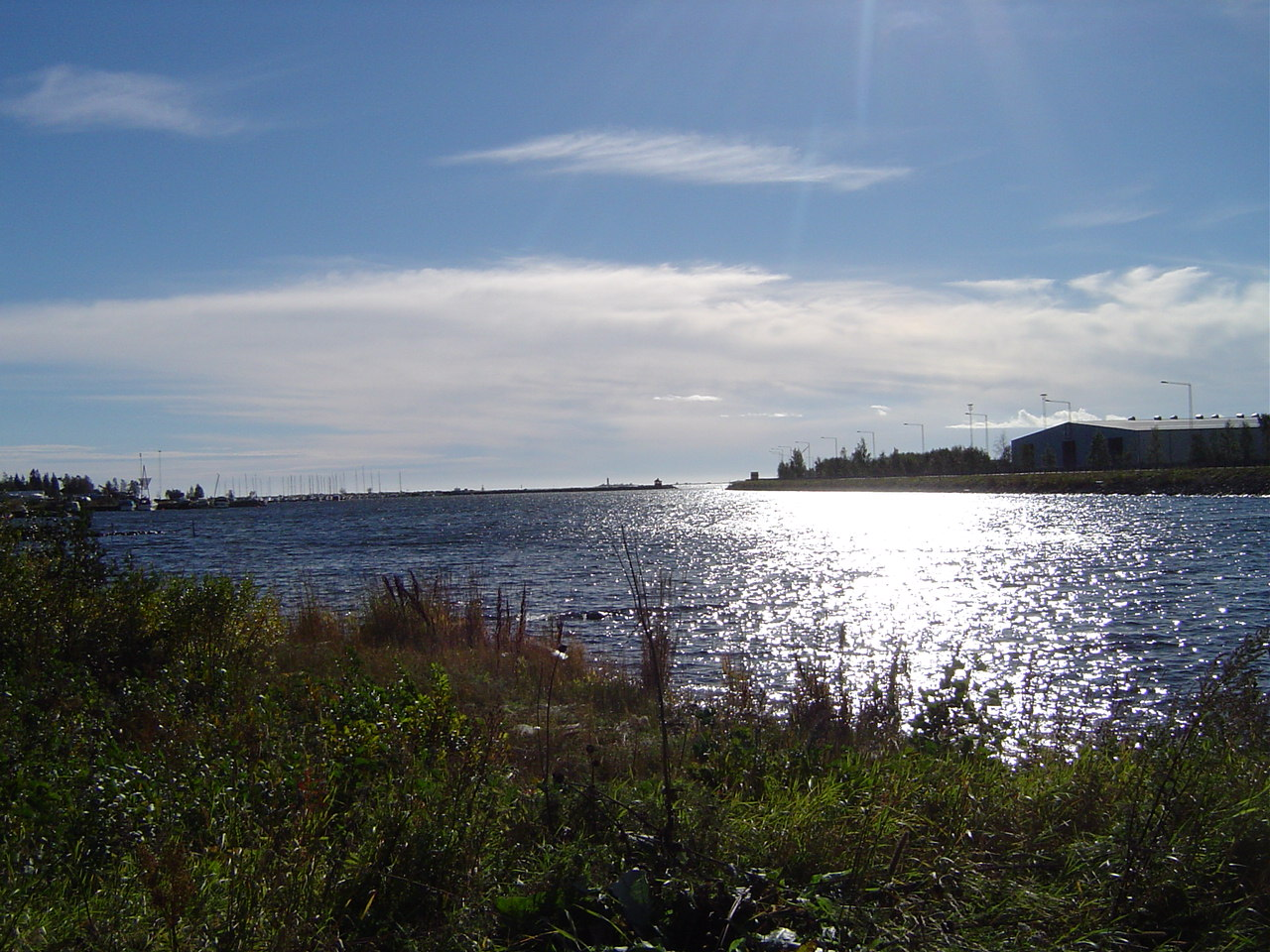
View towards the sea (Patholmsviken).

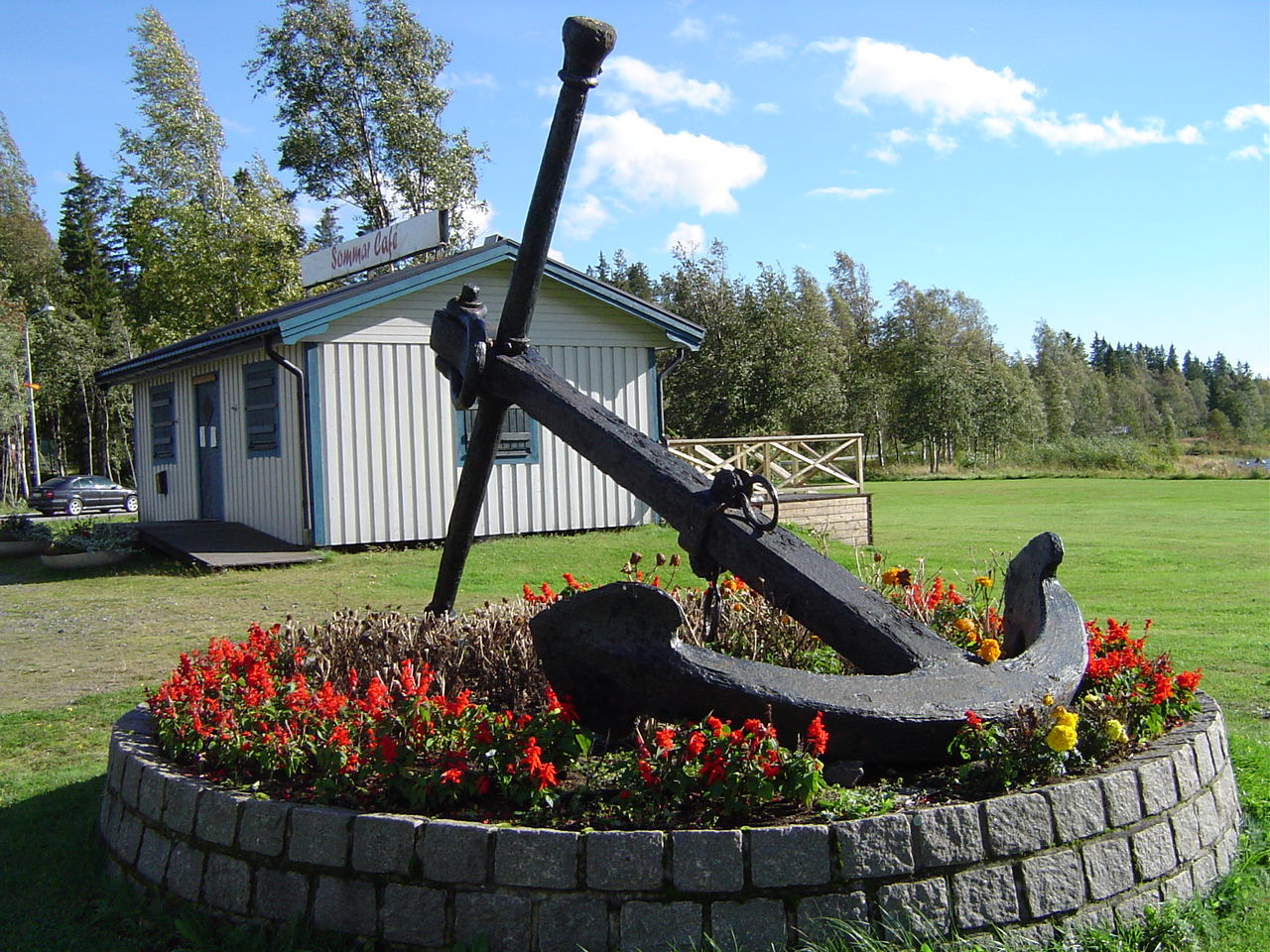
This is an old Swedish anchor which you will find about 10 minutes' walk from Holmsund's centre.

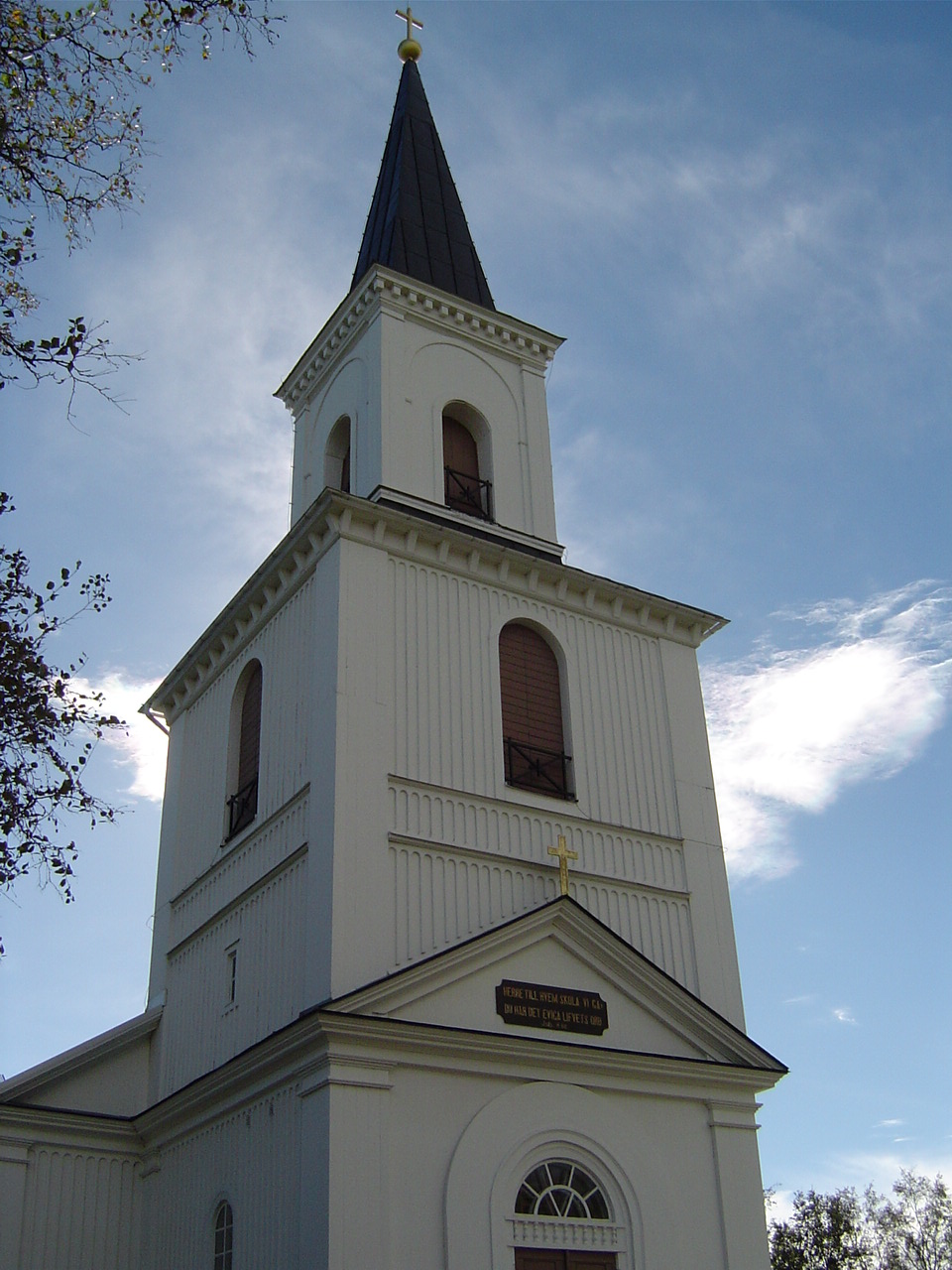
Holmsund Church, located on Västerbacken (Old Holmsund).

== Sport ==
The following sports clubs are located in Holmsund:

- IFK Holmsund
- Sandviks IK

== See also ==
- Blue Highway, an international tourist route
