= Axel Fredrik Enström =

Swedish electrical engineer and civil servant

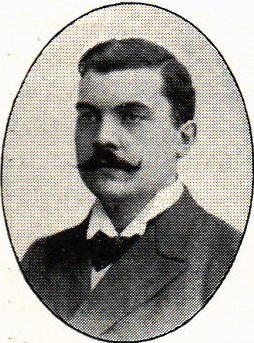
Axel Enström

Axel Fredrik Enström (21 August 1875 – 31 March 1948) was a Swedish electrical engineer and civil servant.

== Biography ==
He was born on 21 August 1875 in Stockholm, Sweden. He graduated from the Royal Institute of Technology. He later earned a Ph.D. from Uppsala University. From 1896 to 1908 he taught physics and electrical engineering at Royal Institute of Technology. From 1903 to 1916 he was a partner in an electrical testing station and he carried out consulting and investigative activities in the electrotechnical field for Sweden. In 1916 Enström was appointed to the National Board of Trade.

In 1918, he took the initiative to form the Royal Swedish Academy of Engineering Sciences (IVA) and in 1919 was appointed IVA's first president, and was at the same time given the title of professor. He served as president until 1940. In 1922, he was elected a member of the Royal Swedish Academy of Sciences.

He died in Sweden on 31 March 1948.
