= Inola, Oklahoma =

- Town
- Nickname: Hay Capital of the World
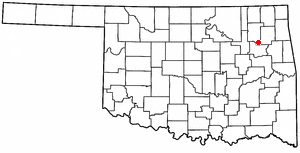
- Location of Inola, Oklahoma
- Coordinates: 36°08′53″N 95°31′29″W
- Country: United States
- State: Oklahoma
- County: Rogers

Area
  - Total: 6.75 sq mi (17.47 km^{2})
  - Land: 6.68 sq mi (17.30 km^{2})
  - Water: 0.069 sq mi (0.18 km^{2})
- Elevation: 574 ft (175 m)

Population (2020)
  - Total: 1,890
  - Density: 283.0/sq mi (109.27/km^{2})
- Time zone: UTC-6 (Central (CST))
  - Summer (DST): UTC-5 (CDT)
- ZIP code: 74036
- Area codes: 539/918
- FIPS code: 40-37100
- GNIS feature ID: 2412794
- Website: http://www.inolaok.com

Inola is also a spider genus (Pisauridae).

Inola is a town in Rogers County, Oklahoma, United States. It is included in the Tulsa Metropolitan Statistical Area (TMSA). As of the 2020 census, Inola had a population of 1,890. Inola is a Cherokee word meaning "Black Fox." The town styles itself as "The Hay Capital of the World."

== History ==
In 1889, the Kansas and Arkansas Valley Railway (later acquired by the Missouri Pacific Railway) built a line from Wagoner through the Foyil area onto the Kansas state line. The area was then just inside the northeastern corner of the Creek Nation in Indian Territory. A post office was established in March 1890 with the name Foyil. It was closed in September 1890 but reopened in April 1891. By 1901, the population was estimated at 100 people. The Dawes Commission had the town platted in 1902, before the Creek allotment.

Strip mines began producing coal nearby before statehood in 1907, causing a small boom in population. Inola's population was 405 in 1920. As the coal industry began to decline, so did the town's population. The 1930 census reported only 399 residents. The decline continued through the post World War II era, reaching 294 in 1950. A turnaround began in the 1950s as residents began commuting to Tulsa. Inola's population grew to 584 in 1960 and 984 in 1970. The 1980 census showed 1,550 residents, increasing to 1,589 in 2000 and 1,788 in 2010.

== Geography ==
According to the United States Census Bureau, the town has a total area of 6.6 square miles (17 km^{2}), of which 6.5 square miles (17 km^{2}) is land and 0.1 square miles (0.26 km^{2}) (0.91%) is water.

== Demographics ==
Historical population
Census	Pop.	Note	%±
1910	405		—
1920	498		23.0%
1930	398		−20.1%
1940	395		−0.8%
1950	294		−25.6%
1960	584		98.6%
1970	948		62.3%
1980	1,550		63.5%
1990	1,444		−6.8%
2000	1,589		10.0%
2010	1,788		12.5%
2020	1,890		5.7%
U.S. Decennial Census

=== 2020 census ===
As of the 2020 census, Inola had a population of 1,890. The median age was 34.6 years. 28.8% of residents were under the age of 18 and 14.4% of residents were 65 years of age or older. For every 100 females there were 87.9 males, and for every 100 females age 18 and over there were 87.2 males age 18 and over.

0.0% of residents lived in urban areas, while 100.0% lived in rural areas.

There were 682 households in Inola, of which 41.5% had children under the age of 18 living in them. Of all households, 49.9% were married-couple households, 16.0% were households with a male householder and no spouse or partner present, and 26.7% were households with a female householder and no spouse or partner present. About 20.4% of all households were made up of individuals and 10.2% had someone living alone who was 65 years of age or older.

There were 773 housing units, of which 11.8% were vacant. The homeowner vacancy rate was 1.5% and the rental vacancy rate was 13.7%.

Racial composition as of the 2020 census
Race	Number	Percent
White	1,353	71.6%
Black or African American	12	0.6%
American Indian and Alaska Native	219	11.6%
Asian	7	0.4%
Native Hawaiian and Other Pacific Islander	0	0.0%
Some other race	8	0.4%
Two or more races	291	15.4%
Hispanic or Latino (of any race)	62	3.3%

== Economy ==
The town has emerged as a bedroom community for Tulsa, about 28 miles to the west.

In October 2020, tissue paper maker Sofidel opened a $360 million production factory in Inola. The 1.8 million-square-foot plant includes a mill that transforms pulp into paper and a conversion facility that makes the finished product. The factory employs more than 300 people, and this number is expected to double with a second operational phase.

== Black Fox Power Plant ==
The Black Fox Nuclear Power Plant was a nuclear power plant proposed by the Public Service Company of Oklahoma (PSO) in May 1973. The facility was to be built approximately 3 miles (4.8 km) outside of Inola and encompass the use of two General Electric (GE) Boiling Water Reactors. PSO argued that there would be great economic growth and better schools in the town. Many residents as well as outsiders were convinced that it would be dangerous to locate such a facility in their backyards. After nine years of court battles and minor earthquakes in the area, the decision was abandoned in 1982 and no complex was built.
