= Royal Swedish Academy of Engineering Sciences =

Swedish academic society

- Kungliga Ingenjörsvetenskapsakademien
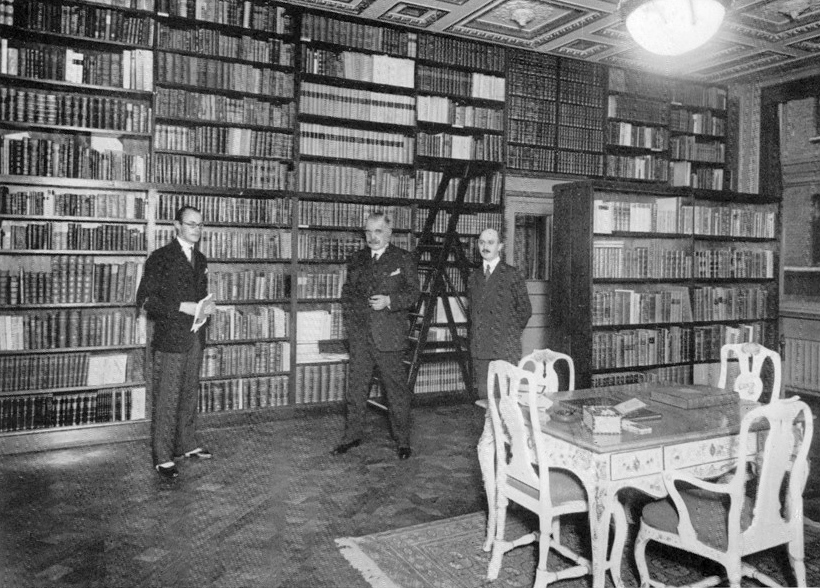
- Formation: 26 October 1919
- Headquarters: Stockholm, Sweden
- Members: 1000 members 300 foreign members
- Preses: Carl-Henric Svanberg
- Website: www.iva.se

The Royal Swedish Academy of Engineering Sciences (Swedish: Kungliga Ingenjörsvetenskapsakademien, IVA), founded on 24 October 1919 by King Gustaf V, is one of the royal academies in Sweden. The academy is an independent organisation, which promotes contact and exchange between business, research, and government, in Sweden and internationally. It is the world's oldest academy of engineering sciences.(OECD Reviews of Innovation Policy: Sweden 2012).

== Leadership ==
The King is the patron of the academy. The following people have been presidents of IVA since its foundation in 1919:

- 1919–1940: Axel F. Enström
- 1941–1959: Edy Velander
- 1960–1970: Sven Brohult
- 1971–1982: Gunnar Hambraeus
- 1982–1994: Hans G. Forsberg
- 1995–2000: Kurt Östlund
- 1999–2001: (temporary) Enrico Deiaco
- 2001–2008: Lena Treschow Torell
- 2008–2017: Björn O. Nilsson
- 2017–2023: Tuula Teeri
- 2024-Present Sylvia Schwaag Serger

== Academy member ==
Each year, outstanding scientists and engineers from universities and industries are elected into membership of IVA. Currently, the academy has 1000 Swedish and 300 foreign members. Foreign members are non-resident and non-citizen of Sweden. All new members are nominated by existing members.

== Focus areas ==
The academy focuses on twelve areas of engineering sciences:

- Mechanical Engineering
- Electrical Engineering
- Building and Construction
- Chemical Engineering
- Mining and Materials
- Management
- Basic and Interdisciplinary Engineering Sciences
- Forest Technology
- Economics
- Biotechnology
- Education and Research Policy
- Information Technology

Each focus area is addressed by a committee with a representative chair.

== Awards ==
The academy awards several prizes, medals and scholarships:

- Great Gold Medal (since 1924)
- Gold Medal (since 1921)
- Brinell medal (Brinellmedaljen, since 1936, and named after Johan August Brinell)
- Gold Plaque (since 1951)
- Honorary Sign (since 1919)
- Axel F. Enstrom Medal (1959–1981)
- Prize for science in journalism (since 2015)
- Hans Werthén Fonden
- The King Carl XVI Gustafs 50-years-old Foundation

== See also ==
- List of Swedish scientists
- Royal Academy of Engineering, UK
- Royal Swedish Academy of Sciences, Sweden
- Spanish Royal Academy of Sciences, Spain
- National Academy of Engineering, USA
