= SCA (company) =

Swedish timber, pulp and paper manufacturer

Svenska Cellulosa Aktiebolaget
- Type: Publicly traded Aktiebolag
- Traded as: Nasdaq Stockholm: SCA A,SCA B
- ISIN: SE0000171886, SE0000112724
- Industry: Forestry, Contianerboard and Wood pulp, Renewable energy
- Founded: 27 November 1929; 96 years ago
- Headquarters: Sundsvall, Sweden
- Key people: Helena Stjernholm (Chairman), Ulf Larsson (President and CEO)
- Products: Sawn wood products, Wood pulp, Containerboard, Wind power, Bio fuel
- Revenue: SEK 20,427 million (end 2025)
- Operating income: SEK 4,432 million (end 2025)
- Net income: SEK 3,205 million (end 2025)
- Total assets: SEK 103,766 million (end 2025)
- Total equity: SEK 101,504 million (end 2025)
- Number of employees: 3,450 (end 2025)
- Website: www.sca.com

Svenska Cellulosa Aktiebolaget (lit. 'Swedish Cellulose Stock Corporation') is a Swedish timber, pulp and paper manufacturer with headquarters in Sundsvall. It has approximately 3,450 employees and a turnover of approximately SEK 20.2 billion (€1.8 billion). Its main products include many one-use paper products, containerboard, solid-wood products, pulp and forest-based biofuel. SCA is Europe's largest private owner of forest land, with 2.7 million hectares. The global hygiene product company Essity was part of SCA until 2017.

== History ==
SCA was founded by Ivar Kreuger on 27 November 1929 as a holding company for ten Swedish forest industry companies. Following Kreuger's bankruptcy in 1932, the company came to be controlled by the bank Handelsbanken, who along with associated funds and companies continue to control SCA. Axel Enström was the managing director from 1950 to 1960 and chairman of the board from 1960 to 1965.

In 1975 SCA acquired Mölnlycke, a leading western European producer of disposable hygiene products, and in 1990 SCA acquired transport packaging company Reedpack. In 1995 the Germany-based paper and packaging company PWA was acquired. In 2001 the division Wisconsin Tissue of the United States company Georgia-Pacific Tissue was acquired.

In 2007, SCA bought the European business of Procter & Gamble, significantly expanding its hygiene product business. In 2008 SCA increases ownership in Chinese tissue company Vinda. In 2012 SCA divested its packaging operations – excluding the two kraftliner mills in Sweden – to DS Smith.

In August 2015 it was announced that SCA was to invest in increased capacity for mass production at the Östrand pulp mill in Timrå, Sweden. The annual production capacity of bleached sulphate pulp was to increase from approximately 430 000 tonnes to 900 000 tonnes. The investment amounted to approximately SEK 7.8 billion (€815m) and was expected to be one of the largest industrial investment in the history of Norrland.

In August 2015 it was announced that SCA's hygiene operations and forest operations were to be divided into two different divisions. A year later, 24 August 2016, the company announced that it intended to split SCA into two separately listed companies. In 2017 the company Essity was formed and was introduced on the Stock Exchange in Stockholm.

In September 2021, St1 and SCA announced their half-owned joint ventures St1 Gothenburg Biorefinery AB and SCA Östrand Biorefinery. The biorefinery in Gothenburg produces biofuel from pine oil from SCA and other renewable raw materials

== Business ==
SCA's operations are divided in five business areas: Forest, Wood, Containerboard, Pulp and Renewable energy.

=== Manufacturing Units in Sweden ===
Business 2025

- Bollsta sawmill in Bollstabruk
- Gällö sawmill in Gällö
- Pellet (biofuel) manufacturing in Härnösand
- Munksund paper mill, containerboard production (kraftliner white top) in Munksund
- Munksund sawmill
- Obbola paper mill, containerboard production (kraftliner) in Obbola
- Ortviken pulp mill (CTMP) in Sundsvall
- Östrand pulp mill in Timrå
- Tunadal sawmill in Tunadal

The planing mills in Tunadal, Stugun and Bollsta are part of SCA Wood Scandinavia.

=== Operations in other countries ===
SCA has operations in several countries. Located near its own forests in northern Sweden, SCA Wood's sawmills and planing mills supply wood products to global markets. Approximately 950 employees over five sawmills and two planing mills enable deliveries of wood to Europe, North Africa, North America, as well as parts of Asia and the MENA region. Pulp has a sales network in Europe and North America. Containerboard has sales managers in Europe. SCA is present in the Netherlands and Germany in logistics and in the Baltics within the business area SCA Forest. The company has no operations in Russia or Ukraine.

=== Forest holdings ===
SCA is Europe's largest private owner of forest land and manages a total of around 2.6 million hectares (6.4×10^{6} acres) in northern Sweden, of which two million hectares of productive forest land, which corresponds to up to nine percent of Sweden's total productive forest land. The company also has forests in Estonia, Latvia and Lithuania, which are responsible for managing their own forests, felling and purchasing timber in order to supply SCA's industries with raw material. SCA uses its forest to produce wood-based products such as sawn timber, paper pulp and packaging paper (kraftliner). The company owns wind turbines and produces solid and liquid biofuels from its by-products. The company also provides services for forest owners and transport solutions.

== Sustainability ==
During the autumn of 2025, SCA's forestry operations were audited in accordance with the FSC Forest Management Standard, with a successful outcome. FSC welcomes a new agreement on forest management and Sami rights in Sweden, which strengthened the customer dialogue and pleased the majority of SCA's customer relations.

During 2025 and 2026 the companies L'Oréal, Zalando and Nestlé stopped using SCA as their supplier after controversies around their forestry practices.

== See also ==
- Stora Enso
- UPM (company)
- Holmen
