= Sofidel Group =

Italian multinational producer of tissue paper

Sofidel S.p.A.
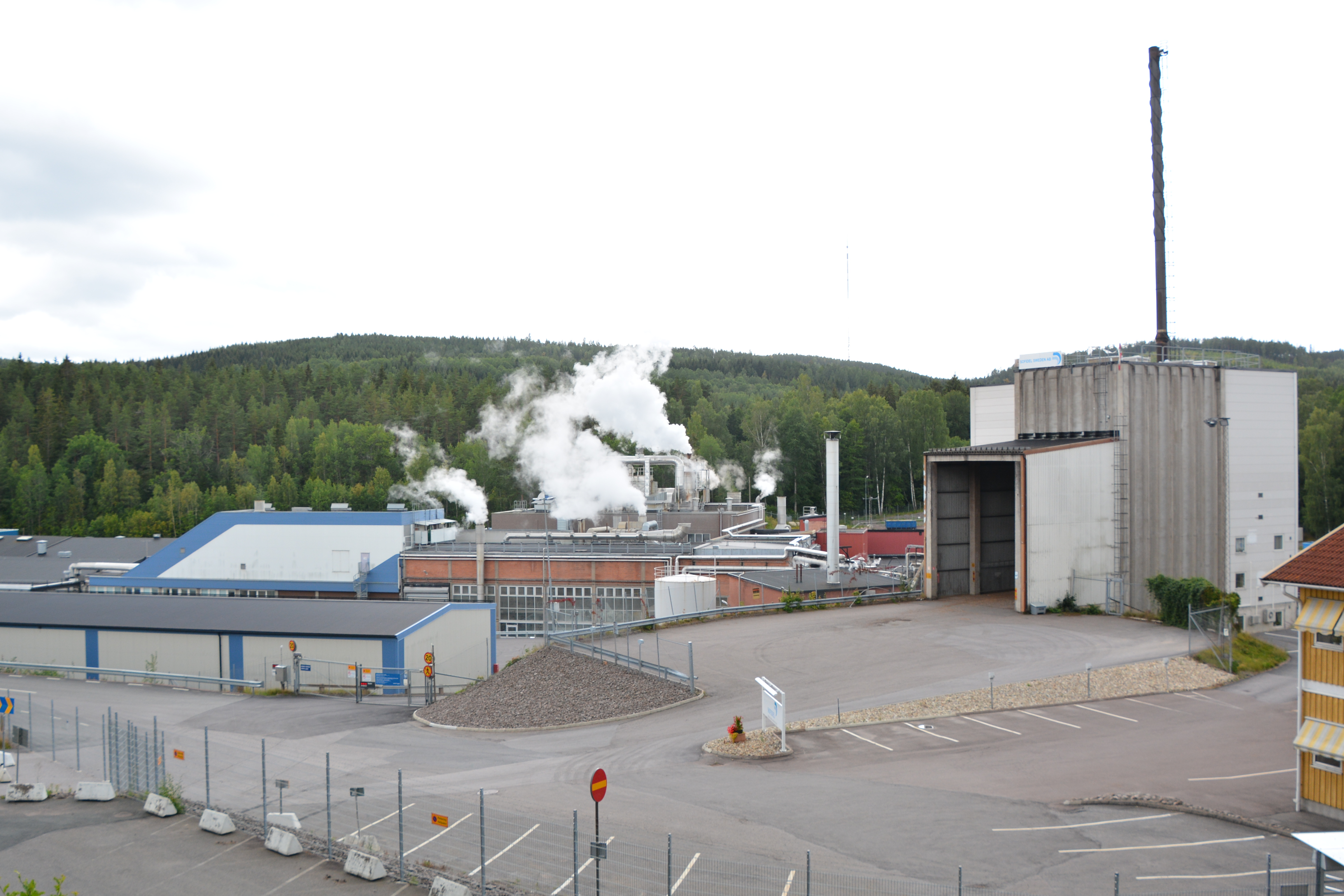
- Type: Joint-stock company
- Industry: paper
- Founded: 1966; 60 years ago
- Founder: Emi Stefani; Giuseppe Lazzareschi
- Headquarters: Porcari, Italy, ITA
- Area served: Worldwide
- Key people: Paola Stefani, Chairman; Luigi Lazzareschi, CEO
- Products: products in paper
- Revenue: ▲€ 2.8 b (fiscal year 2023)
- Owner: Sofidel Group S.P.A.
- Number of employees: beyond 6,900 (year 2023)
- Website: www.sofidel.com

Sofidel is an Italian multinational producer of tissue paper for sanitary and domestic use. The Sofidel Group was founded in 1966. It is one of the world leaders in the tissue paper market and the second largest producer in Europe behind Essity. The privately held company is owned by the Stefani and Lazzareschi families, has subsidiaries in 13 countries and more than 6,600 employees.

== Timeline ==
In 2010, Sofidel's production capacity totaled 940,000 tons, in 2015 the number rose to 1,050,000 tonnes (1,030,000 long tons; 1,160,000 short tons) per year.

In 2008, Sofidel joined the WWF as a member and the first Italian manufacturer and the first company in the world from the tissue sector. Over the years, the partnership has led to several joint marketing and communications projects.

In 2015, it announced multiple US investments, being the first Italian tissue company to make it into the US market.

In 2016, it was announced that 100% of Sofidel tissue products in Western Europe will bear the FSC label.

In 2017, Sofidel is present in 7 states in the US, where it has a production capacity of 200,000 tons.

In October 2018, the Group's largest, most modern and sustainable production facility opened in Circleville, Ohio.

In 2021 the Shareholders' Meeting, appointed the new board of directors in which directors from outside the Stefani and Lazzareschi families join for the first time: Chiara Mio, Silvio Bianchi Martini, Andrea Munari and Alessandro Solidoro.

In March 2021 Edilio Stefani succeeded his father, Emi Stefani, as chairman of Sofidel.

At the end of March 2023, the Group announced the acquisition of the Hakle brand and other brands. Hakle is one of Germany's most beloved brands in the toilet paper market, produced since 1928.

== Business ==
The Sofidel Group operates an integrated production cycle that covers the entire process from the manufacture of tissue reels to the conversion of those reels into finished products. This vertically integrated structure allows the company to manage multiple stages of production within the same corporate system.

The group's activities are organized into four main business lines: consumer brands, private label products (distributor brands), away-from-home (AFH) products intended for professional and institutional use, and parent reels, which are semi-finished tissue reels supplied to other paper companies for further processing.

== Partnership ==
In 2008 Sofidel became a partner in WWF's international Climate Savers program. In the same year it joins the United Nations Global Compact, supporting environmental sustainability projects. To date, the Group has ongoing collaborations with influential partners: in addition to institutional ones (WWF, Ocean Conservancy, EU-OSHA - European Agency for Safety and Health at Work, UN Global Compact Network Italy) it has important synergies through its brands and products.

== Sustainability ==
The Sofidel Group considers sustainability a strategic growth factor and is committed to reducing impacts on the environment while striving to create added value for all its stakeholders. Sofidel's greenhouse gas emission reduction targets to 2030 have been recognized by Science Based Targets initiative (SBTi) to be in line with the levels required to limit global warming well below 2 °C, as required by the Paris Agreement. Sofidel was the first Italian manufacturing company, and the first in the world in the tissue sector, to join the WWF Climate Savers program, aimed at leading companies on the low-carbon economy front. The Group has its results verified by third parties in order to safeguard the reliability of the data disseminated. In addition to preparing the integrated report, Sofidel has submitted its results to CDP, Ecovadis, and Morningstar Sustainalytics, obtaining positive recognitions

== Objectives ==
Sofidel set environmental goals for 2030: a 98% recycled water rate at production sites (to date it counts 96.2%); 84% energy purchased from renewable sources; a 50% reduction in the incidence of plastic in packaging; -40% reduction of scope 1, 2 and 3 CO_{2} emissions for pulp suppliers; -24% reduction of scope 3 CO_{2} emissions for all other suppliers.
