= Anderson Tanoto =

Businessman and foundation director

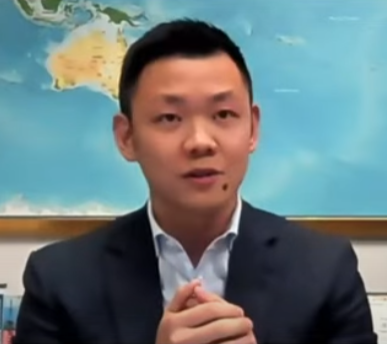
- Speaking at the 2021 World Economic Forum
- Born: Anderson Tanoto He; 4 February 1989 (age 37)
- Education: University of Pennsylvania (BS)
- Occupations: Businessman; racing driver; philanthropist
- Employer: Royal Golden Eagle
- Organization: Tanoto Foundation
- Title: Managing Director
- Parents: Sukanto Tanoto (father); Tinah Bingei Tanoto (mother)
- Relatives: Belinda Tanoto (sister)

Anderson Tanoto He (born 4 February 1989) is an Indonesian philanthropist and racing driver. He is a member of the board of trustees at Tanoto Foundation, a philanthropic organization involved in poverty alleviation. Tanoto is the youngest son of businessman and philanthropist Sukanto Tanoto. He received a Bachelor of Science in economics from University of Pennsylvania's Wharton School. In October 2017, he was named to The Wharton School's "40 Under 40" list. Tanoto also sits on the Wharton Executive Board of Asia.

== Career ==
After graduation, Tanoto became a consultant at Bain & Company.

Tanoto joined Royal Golden Eagle (RGE) in March 2013 and serves as managing director as of 2021. Founded by his father, Sukanto Tanoto, RGE manages a group of resource-based manufacturing companies operating in Indonesia, China, Brazil, Canada and Europe, with over US$35 billion in assets and a workforce of 70,000 people. He has worked on RGE-managed APRIL's operations located in Pangkalan Kerinci, Riau, Indonesia. He has received praise for his approach to growing the business efficiently and personally emphasizing the company's commitment to sustainability.

At COP 21 on 1 December 2015, Tanoto was part of a team that announced APRIL's US$100 million investment in an expanded eco-restoration project in Riau, spanning 150,000 hectares.

At the Responsible Business Forum in Jakarta in February 2017, Tanoto was a panelist as the Fire Free Alliance—an industry group comprising members APRIL, Asian Agri, IDH, Musim Mas, PM.Haze, and Wilmar—marked its first anniversary in contributing solutions to Indonesia's persistent fire and haze problems with a focus on fire prevention through community engagement.

On 2 May 2018, Tanoto was appointed Chairman of the Brazil Committee under the Indonesian Chamber of Commerce and Industry (KADIN). The committee was set up to boost trade relations and technology transfer between Indonesia and Brazil.

== Philanthropy ==
Apart from his business interests, Tanoto also works in community development and philanthropy, which was sparked in his youth when his parents frequently brought him and his siblings to Indonesian fields and plantations. He is actively involved in the Tanoto Foundation, a non-profit charitable organization founded in 1981 by the Tanoto family to reduce poverty through education, empowerment and enhancement. As a member of the Board of Trustees of Tanoto Foundation, Tanoto drives various foundation initiatives focusing on Indonesia's next generation.

He initiated a seed funding program for Tanoto Foundation scholars to promote entrepreneurship, and actively participates in the Tanoto Entrepreneurship Series (TES) where prominent speakers such as Jusuf Kalla and then-Jakarta governor Joko Widodo have spoken to the students and scholars of Tanoto Foundation.

== Racing record ==
=== Career summary ===
Season	Series	Team	Races	Wins	Poles	F/Laps	Podiums	Points	Position
2018	Audi R8 LMS Cup - GT4	Hard Memory Hero Super Car Team	6	2	2	0	5	113	1st
2019	Blancpain GT World Challenge Asia - GT4	Absolute Racing	2	0	0	0	2	33	12th
2019	Porsche Carrera Cup Asia	Absolute Racing	2	0	0	0	0	0	28th
2019	Audi R8 LMS Cup - GT4	Absolute Racing	4	2	2	2	3	70	2nd
2021	Michelin Pilot Challenge - GS	Automatic Racing AMR	1	0	0	0	0	110	63rd
2022	GT4 America Series - Pro-Am	Absolute Racing	2	0	0	0	0	?	?
2022	Michelin Pilot Challenge - GS	Absolute Racing	1	0	0	0	0	50	71st
2023	GT4 America Series - Pro-Am	SP Motorsports	4	0	0	0	0	16	18th
2024	Porsche Carrera Cup Asia	Trans-China Automotive Racing	2	0	0	0	0	0	NC†
2024-25	Asian Le Mans Series - GT	Earl Bamber Motorsport	2	0	0	0	0	0	25th
2025	GT World Challenge Asia	Absolute Corse							
2025	Thailand Super Series - GT3	Absolute Corse							
2026	Porsche Carrera Cup Asia	Absolute Racing	4	0	0	0	0	0	29th
2026	GT World Challenge Asia	Absolute Corse	4	0	0	0	0	8	35th

‡ Team standings

=== Complete GT World Challenge Asia results ===
Year	Team	Car	Class	1	2	3	4	5	6	7	8	9	10	11	12	DC	Pts
2025	Absolute Corse	Ferrari 296 GT3	Pro-Am	SEP; 18	SEP; Ret	MAN	MAN	CHA	CHA	FUJ	FUJ	OKA	OKA	BEI	BEI	NC*	0*
