= Sukanto Tanoto =

Indonesian businessman (born 1949)

- 陳江和
- Born: Tan Kang Hoo; 25 December 1949 (age 76); Medan, North Sumatra, Indonesia
- Citizenship: Indonesia
- Spouse: Tinah Bingei Tanoto
- Children: Andre Tanoto; Imelda Tanoto; Belinda Tanoto; Anderson Tanoto

Chinese name
- Traditional Chinese: 陳江和
- Simplified Chinese: 陈江和
- Hanyu Pinyin: Chén Jiāng Hé
- Hokkien POJ: Tân Kang hām

Sukanto Tanoto, born Tan Kang Hoo (Chinese: 陳江和; Pe̍h-ōe-jī: Tân Kang Hām; born 25 December 1949) is an Indonesian businessman primarily involved in resources-based manufacturing. After starting as a supplier of equipment and materials for the state-owned oil firm Pertamina, Tanoto moved into the forest industry in 1973. Tanoto's business interests are represented by the Royal Golden Eagle (RGE) group of companies, previously known as Raja Garuda Mas.

== Biography ==
Born in Medan, North Sumatra province, Tanoto is the oldest of seven boys. His father was a Chinese immigrant from Putian, Fujian province. In 1966, Tanoto's education was abruptly interrupted after Chinese schools were shut down by then-President Suharto's new order regime. He was prohibited from attending national schools due to his parents' Chinese citizenship.

When his father suffered a stroke, Tanoto was left to run the family business. He gradually moved beyond basic trading to winning contracts in building gas pipelines for multinationals. During the 1973 oil crisis that increased prices dramatically, Tanoto took advantage of clients rapidly expanding their operations. With this injection of capital, Tanoto turned his attention to another business in 1973, noticing that Indonesia exported raw logs for conversion into plywood in countries like Japan or Taiwan, before importing the finished plywood back to Indonesia at great cost.

Tanoto recognized an opportunity to develop his own plywood mill in Indonesia but required a permit to do so. Under the Suharto regime, permits were sought from politicians who often served as army generals. Tanoto was forced to work with a general who gave his blessing and was quickly convinced of the mill's potential after seeing the completed factory, with Tanoto citing the potential value-add to Indonesia's economy and the creation of new jobs. The plant began operations in 1975 after being inaugurated by Suharto. Slowly, from the plywood business, his company branched out into palm oil as well as pulp and paper.

Tanoto is a self-educated entrepreneur but regretted his interrupted education. He learned English word-for-word using a Chinese-English dictionary and finally attended business school in Jakarta in the mid-1970s. He also undertook further studies at INSEAD in Fontainebleau, France.

In 1997, Tanoto elected to settle in Singapore with his family, establishing his company's headquarters there.

Three of his children are active within RGE and its businesses. His son, Anderson, is an RGE director. His eldest daughter Imelda is a member of the RGE executive committee, while his younger daughter Belinda dedicates most of her time to the family's philanthropic arm, Tanoto Foundation, of which all four of Tanoto's children are trustee members.

== Business activities ==
Tanoto's business interests are represented by the Royal Golden Eagle (RGE), a global resource-based group of companies with manufacturing operations in Indonesia, China, Brazil, Canada and Europe and sales offices worldwide. Since Tanoto started his entrepreneurial journey in 1967, the business has grown considerably, with a workforce of over 80,000 people and assets exceeding US$40 billion. The business has five key operational areas: pulp and paper (Asia Pacific Resources International Holdings or APRIL, Asia Symbol, Vinda), agro-industry (Asian Agri, Apical), specialty cellulose (Bracell Limited), viscose fibre (Sateri, Asia Pacific Rayon), and energy resources development (Pacific Energy, formerly Pacific Oil & Gas).

In early 2016, Tanoto announced an update of the RGE groupwide business principles - to do what is good for community, country, climate and company. In 2017, marking his 50th year as an entrepreneur, Sukanto Tanoto introduced 'Customer' as the fifth C.

=== APRIL Deforestation Controversy ===
APRIL has been involved in conservation controversies related to the use of native Sumatran growth forests, which led to the company withdrawing from the Forest Stewardship Council in April 2010. In September 2011, Fuji Xerox ceased selling paper manufactured by APRIL. The company has denied the claims, stating it has a commitment to implement practices that mitigate climate change and promote sustainability. In a 2013 report, Greenpeace addresses the influence of deforestation for palm oil that drives Sumatran tigers toward extinction. According to that report, "Tanoto, through his business empire, carries the dubious distinction of being the single largest driver of deforestation in the world identified by Greenpeace." In June 2015, APRIL pledged to eliminate deforestation from its entire supply chain. The announcement was well received by both Greenpeace and the World Wildlife Fund.

== See also ==
- Energy in Indonesia
