= Lenzing AG =

Austrian chemical company

- Type: Aktiengesellschaft
- Traded as: WBAG: LNZ
- Industry: Chemicals
- Founded: 1938 (Zellwolle Lenzing AG)
- Headquarters: Lenzing, Austria
- Key people: Stefan Doboczky (CEO), Hanno Bästlein (Chairman of the supervisory board)
- Products: Textile fibers, nonwoven fabrics, pulp, thermoplastics, PTFE, acrylic fibers
- Revenue: €2.60 billion (2025)
- Operating income: €17,6 million (2025)
- Net income: €-135.2 million (2025)
- Total assets: €4,609.4 billion (end 2025)
- Total equity: €1,305.3 billion (end 2025)
- Number of employees: 7,738 (end 2025)
- Website: www.lenzing.com

The Lenzing Group is an international group with its headquarters in Lenzing, Austria, and production sites in all major markets. Lenzing produces wood-based viscose fibers, modal fibers, lyocell fibers and filament yarn, which are used in the textile industry — in clothing, home textiles and technical textiles — as well as in the nonwovens industry. In addition, the company is active in mechanical and plant engineering. The Lenzing Group markets its products under the brand names Tencel, Veocel, Lenzing Ecovero and Lenzing.

== History ==
The company initially focused solely on fiber production, but it needed plastic wrappings for its fiber bales, so Lenzing Plastics was founded to produce them. The plastics division is still active, making 11.7% of total sales in 2009.

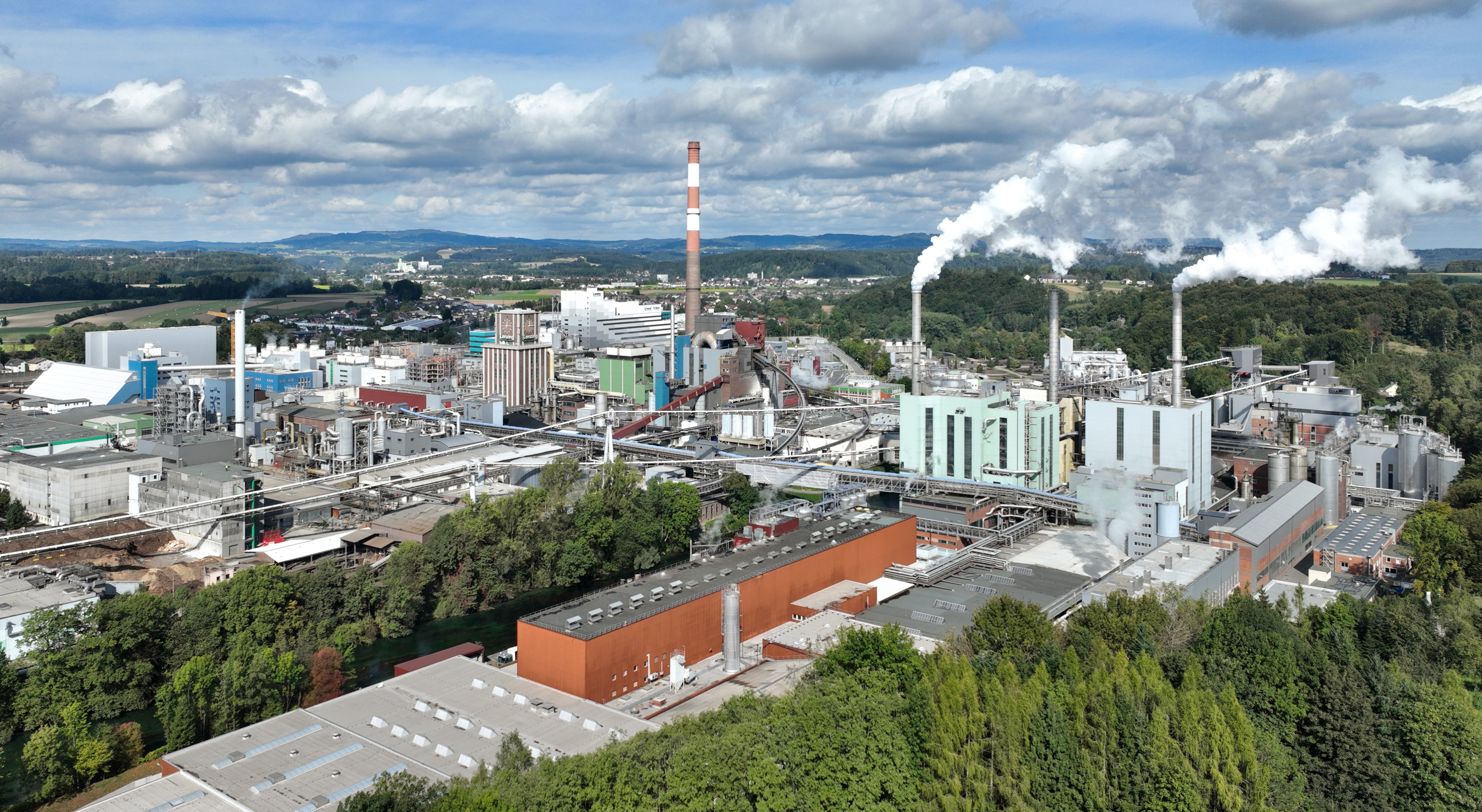
Lenzing AG in Lenzing

The company's history goes back to 1892, when Emil Hamburger, an industrialist, operated a paper mill in Lenzing, Austria.

In 1935/36, the share majority was acquired by the Bunzl family and the company was affiliated to the Bunzl & Biach AG circle of interests, Vienna. The company was expanded and modernized.

== Nazi era ==
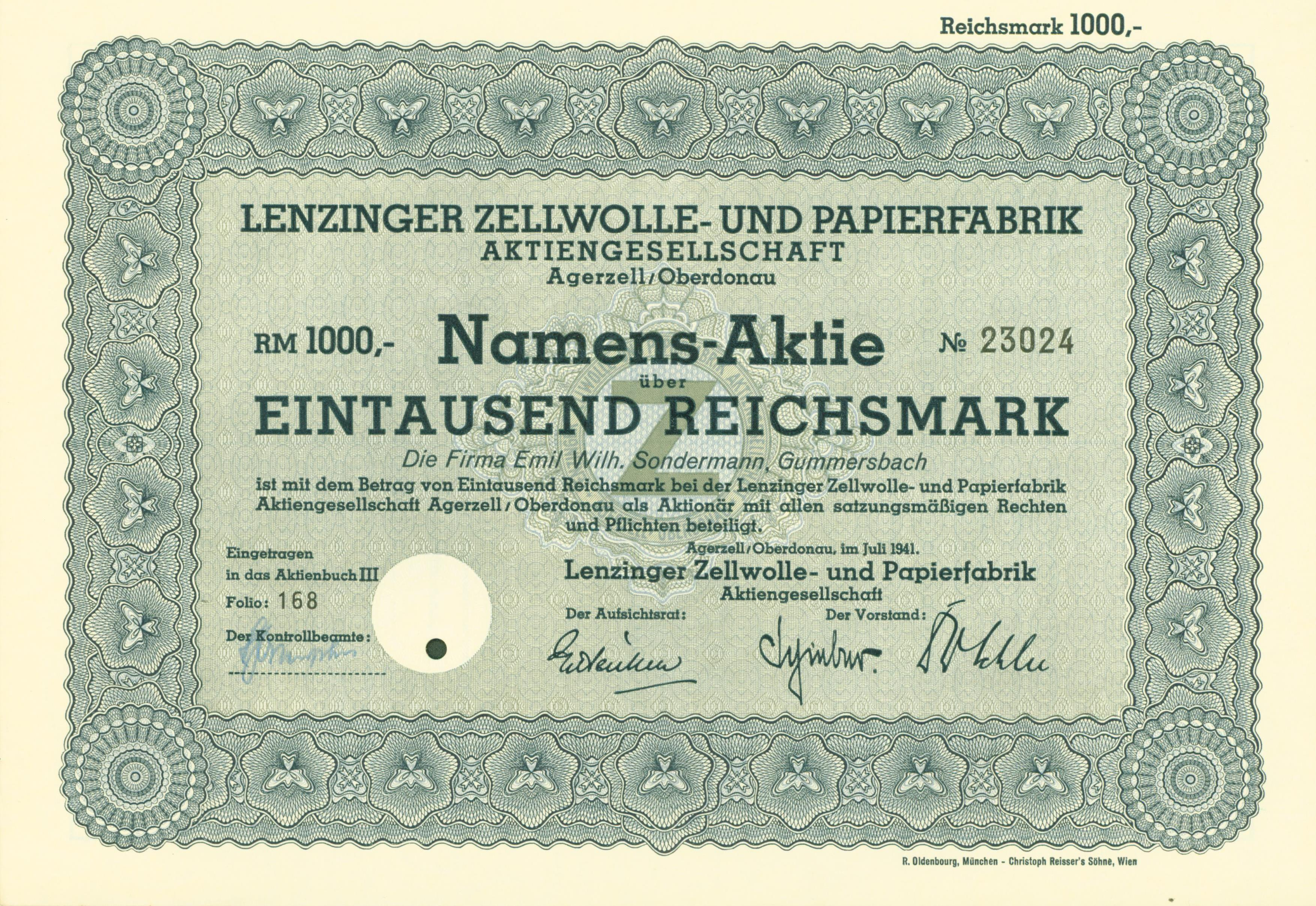
Share of the Lenzinger Zellwolle- und Papierfabrik AG, issued July 1941

After the incorporation of Austria into the German Reich in the Anschluss of 1938, Zellwolle Lenzing AG was founded in Lenzing by Thüringische Zellwolle AG, Schwarza/Saale, with Austrian industry subscribing to 50% of the share capital. At the beginning of July, construction of a new rayon factory was started in Lenzing. Production started in September 1939. The general director was the Nazi multifunctional SS brigadier Walther Schieber. The Bunzl Group was aryanized by the Oesterreichische Kontrollbank für Industrie und Handel, the Lenzinger Papierfabrik-Aktiengesellschaft, renamed Lenzinger Zellstoff- und Papierfabrik AG in 1939, was merged into the company in 1940. The merged company was renamed Lenzinger Zellwolle- und Papierfabrik Aktiengesellschaft. In order to remedy the labor shortage caused by the ongoing call-ups for military service, forced laborers were soon employed. Three camps were set up on the site of the disused Pettighofen paper mill on the Agerstrasse. The "civilian labor camp" (Wohnlager 505) housed people from more than 17 nations. The "Russian barracks" were set up for Russian prisoners of war. Finally, a detachment of the Mauthausen concentration camp was set up in order to be able to use female concentration camp prisoners. The first women arrived at Lenzing from Mauthausen on November 3, 1944, and in January 1945, the number peaked at 565 women. The camp was liberated by the 3rd U.S. Army on May 8, 1945, after Paul Le Caër informed the troops of the camp's existence.

The planned destruction of the plant was prevented by resistance groups.

== After 1945 ==
By the end of the 1940s, the total complex of social enterprises included a wood grinding mill, a pulp and paper mill and a rayon mill in Lenzing, a sawmill in Schörfling, and a hydroelectric power plant each in Lenzing and Pettighofen. The products were cellulose, paper, groundwood pulp, lumber and Glauber's salt (as a waste product). The number of employees at that time was over 2,300 workers and salaried employees.

In 1949, the Lenzing pulp and paper mill, which had been taken over in 1940, was restituted to the previous owners of this company before 1938 (the Bunzl-Konzern Holding AG, Zug/Switzerland), which in turn incorporated it into the restored Lenzinger Zellulose- und Papierfabrik AG. At the same time, the company name was changed back to the original form Zellwolle Lenzing AG. Appropriate agreements were made to take account of the many economic interconnections that continued to exist between the social and the separated production sites.

In 1962, the company name was changed to Chemiefaser Lenzing Aktiengesellschaft in view of the planned start of production of synthetic fibers. At that time, the company's holdings included the rayon factory, a cellulose glass factory that had been put into operation in the fall of 1951, and its own power plant. In 1964, an agreement was concluded with Courtaulds Limited, London, providing for close cooperation in the field of research, processes and production for viscose fibers. In 1965, the construction of a plant for sulfuric acid production was started at Lenzing, which went into operation at the end of the same year. In 1967, a plant was built for the production of synthetic films and tapes made of polyethylene and polypropylene for the packaging industry. In 1966, Austria Faserwerke GesmbH was founded jointly with Farbwerke Hoechst AG formerly Meister Lucius & Brüning, Frankfurt a. M. This company built a plant at Lenzing, which went into operation in 1967, for the production of polyester fibers with the brand name Trevira as well as converter and rupture cables made of polyethylene terephthalate according to a licensing process of Farbwerke Hoechst AG. The company was also responsible for the production of polyethylene terephthalate.

The old calcium bisulphite method was used for fiber production until 1963, when the new more eco-friendly magnesium bisulphite method was introduced. In 1975, the company established a department responsible for the environment and introduced a more "green" bleaching process for pulp in 1977. In 1984, the company name changed to Lenzing AG and its shares were listed on the Vienna Stock Exchange in 1986.

Lenzing Group has international branch offices in the United States, China, India, and Indonesia. Its production facilities are located mainly within the European Union, with the fibers being produced in Austria, United Kingdom, the US, China, and Indonesia, and starting a production facility in Thailand by 2022, while its plastics factories are located in Austria, Germany, the Czech Republic, and the US. The pulp is produced in the Czech Republic and Brazil and the engineering research is done in Lenzing, Austria which is also the largest integrated pulp and viscose fiber production site worldwide.

Total 2009 sales were EUR 1.25 billion, with a workforce of 6,021. The main fiber markets of Lenzing are Asia (52%) and Europe (39%). The majority owner of Lenzing, with 90.15% of voting rights, is B & C Industrieholding GmbH along with its subsidiaries. As of 2007, the corporate group has an annual production of over 500,000 tons of fibers, over 27,000 tons of plastics, and over 80,000 tons of paper. The paper division was sold out in 2008.

In April 2015 Lenzing sold its German subsidiary Dolan, along with Kelheim and a 91-percent stake in European Carbon Fiber GmbH to WHEB Partners' Growth Fund 2 and Jan Verdenhalven. The sale price remains confidential.

Since 2022 Lenzing has been implementing a cost reduction program reducing costs by over 70 Mio. Euro.
