= Gribaldi Handayani =

Indonesian serial killer and ex-police officer

- Born: Muhamad Gribaldi Handayani; 20 July 1966 (age 60); Medan, Indonesia
- Other name: "Heri"
- Conviction: Murder × 7
- Penalty: Death

Details
- Victims: 7
- Span of crimes: 1999–2004
- Country: Indonesia
- States: Riau, South Sumatra
- Date apprehended: January 2005

Muhamad Gribaldi Handayani (born 20 July 1966) is an Indonesian serial killer and former police officer who killed seven acquaintances, including a lover and his third wife, in various incidents from 1999 to 2004. He was eventually convicted and sentenced to death for the crimes, but his current status is unknown.

== Early life ==
Muhamad Gribaldi Handayani was born on 20 July 1966, in Medan. Born into a family of police officers, he spent his formative years in Dumai before returning to Medan to complete his high school and later college education in administrative law.

His career with the Indonesian National Police began in 1985, when he was assigned to the Patrol Units in North Sumatra, before being transferred to the Intel Unit in Medan the following year. Following several transfers between precincts over the next decade, he finally settled in Jambi, where he was eventually promoted to Head of the Telematics Division's Criminal Information Squad. Per standard procedure for law enforcement, he was assigned a service pistol which would be used in all of his killings.

== Murders ==
Handayani's first murder took place on an unspecified date in 1999, in the village of Bagan Batu, Rokan Hilir Regency. He had boarded a taxi operated by 44-year-old Rusdi Hutahuruk of Medan, who supposedly began mocking Handayani by claiming that he appeared to be of Chinese descent due to his paler skin tone and facial features. When Hutahuruk stopped by the road to relieve himself, an angered Handayani took out his service pistol and shot him four times.

By 2000, Handayani had begun a relationship with 27-year-old student Yeni Farida, who eventually revealed to him that she was pregnant and wanted to marry him. Unwilling to commit to her, he lured her out to an isolated location in Kandis, Siak Regency, where he killed her and hid her body, which remains undiscovered to this day.

Sometime in early 2002, Handayani was driving his car in Jambi when he accidentally ran over a man with his car. He then promised the man's widow, 28-year-old Gusmarni, that he would take care of both her and her daughter financially. The pair eventually developed a deep bond, with Handayani offering to give her a job as a civil servant in Pekanbaru. Under this pretence, the pair travelled to Bagan Batu on 5 July, where Gusmarni was shot seven times while urinating. The motive for this crime was apparently that she had demanded too much money from him and that she was three months pregnant.

After two failed marriages, Handayani married a third time to a woman named Nurmata Lily, but eventually grew suspicious of her and accused her of cheating on him. As a result, he drove her to an isolated location near Pangkalan Kerinci in August 2003, where he subsequently shot her. In April 2004, he killed 34-year-old cab driver Muhammad Ali near Jambi after the pair had a disagreement over a car rental business, after which Handayani shot him four times in the head and chest.

On 31 July, Handayani arranged to meet with one of his acquaintances, 50-year-old Ngadimin, a tabloid journalist who helped him broker job offers to potential victims. After being lured to Babat Village in Banyuasin Regency, ostensibly because his friend wanted to discuss business plans for a future trip to Jakarta, Ngadimin was shot to death and his body left in an open field.

In late 2004, Handayani became acquainted with a woman named Listi after they were introduced to one another at a seminar by a friend of hers. Introducing himself as 'Heri', the pair got intimate with one another, with him even promising Listi a job as a civil servant. In December, Handayani called her under the pretence that she had to attend training at a company in Jambi, after which Listi left her house, promising to bring back a souvenir to her family. When she failed to return home, family members notified the authorities, who subsequently located her body near the village of Bayu Lincir in South Sumatra on 1 January 2005. An autopsy at the Raden Mataher Hospital confirmed that she had been shot to death.

== Arrest, trial, and imprisonment ==
Soon after the discovery of Listi's body, Handayani was designated a prime suspect since he was the last person seen with her. An inspection of his home revealed thousands of rounds of ammunition, with bullets from his service pistol matching the ones found at the crime scene. Soon afterwards, other victims' families reported their suspicions to the police, leading to the location of other bodies found buried in shallow graves and which were successfully linked back to Handayani.

After being charged with murder, Handayani claimed that he had not acted alone and implicated the editor-in-chief of a Jambi-based tabloid, Ali Yusuf, as his co-conspirator. Yusuf vehemently denied the accusations, and since no evidence implicated him in the crimes, he was never charged. In another bid to avoid the death penalty, Handayani attempted to claim that he was insane, but a psychological evaluation at the Pekanbaru Mental Hospital determined that he was sane to stand trial.

As a majority of the victims had been killed in Riau, prosecutors decided that they would put him on trial there. Due to the overwhelming amount of evidence against him, Handayani was swiftly convicted and sentenced to death. Since his conviction, there have been no reports indicating that his death sentence has been carried out, and it is unknown if he is still alive, but many media reported that he was executed on July 9, 2006

== See also ==
- List of serial killers by country
