= Key Witness =

Key Witness may refer to:

- Key Witness (1947 film)
- Key Witness (1960 film)
- Key Witness (book)
