= Dissolving pulp =

Bleached wood pulp or cotton linters with a high cellulose content

Dissolving pulp, also called dissolving cellulose, is bleached wood pulp or cotton linters that has a high cellulose content (> 90%). It has special properties including a high level of brightness and uniform molecular-weight distribution. This pulp is manufactured for uses that require a high chemical purity, and particularly low hemicellulose content, since the chemically similar hemicellulose can interfere with subsequent processes. Dissolving pulp is so named because it is not made into paper, but dissolved either in a solvent or by derivatization into a homogeneous solution, which makes it completely chemically accessible and removes any remaining fibrous structure. Once dissolved, it can be spun into textile fibers (viscose or Lyocell), or chemically reacted to produce derivatized celluloses, such cellulose triacetate, a plastic-like material formed into fibers or films, or cellulose ethers such as methyl cellulose, used as a thickener.

== Manufacture ==
=== Pulpwood ===
Dissolving pulp is mainly produced chemically from pulpwood in a process that has a low yield (30 - 35% of the wood). This makes up of about 85 - 88% of the production. Dissolving pulp is made from the sulfite process or the kraft process with an acid prehydrolysis step to remove hemicelluloses. For the highest quality, it should be derived from fast-grown hardwoods with low non-cellulose content.

The sulfite process produces pulp with a cellulose content up to 92 percent. It can use ammonium, calcium, magnesium or sodium as a base. The prehydrolysis sulfate process produces pulp with a cellulose content up to 96%.

Special alkaline purification treatments can yield even higher cellulose levels: up to 96 percent for the sulfite process and up to 98 percent for the sulfate process.

=== Cotton linters ===
A minor part is produced from the shortest cotton linters, normally second cut. These are washed mechanically and chemically to remove proteins, waxes, pectins and other polysaccharides. This is bleached to get the required brightness. Dissolving pulp from cellulose linters gives the purest cellulose and is used to manufacture acetate plastics and high-viscosity cellulose ethers.

== Applications ==
Dissolving pulp is used in production of regenerated cellulose. In the regenerated cellulose process the cellulose is converted to cellulose xanthate which dissolves easily in caustic soda. The resulting viscous liquid can be extruded through spinnerettes and regenerated as man-made fibres. Cellulose can also be dissolved in some organic solvents directly and processed to regenerate the cellulose fibres in different forms. The lyocell process uses an amine oxide to dissolve cellulose and Tencel is the only commercial example of this direct-dissolution process, which unlike the viscose process is pollution-free.

The 90-92% cellulose content sulfite pulps are used mostly to make textiles (like rayon) and cellophane. The 96-% cellulose content sulfate pulps are used to make rayon yarn for industrial products such as tire cord, rayon staple for high-quality fabrics, and various acetate and other specialty products.

As a raw material of cellulose derivatives, dissolving pulp is used in carboxymethyl cellulose (CMC), methyl cellulose (MC), hydroxypropyl cellulose (HPC), hydroxyethyl cellulose (HEC), etc.

Since dissolving pulp is highly refined, it is a product of high whiteness with few impurities making it suitable in specialty paper-related products such as filter paper and vulcanized fibre.

Cellulose powder is dissolving pulp that has undergone acid hydrolysis, been mechanically disintegrated and made into fine powder.

This pulp is used as a filler for urea-formaldehyde resins and melamine resin products.
