= Belinda Tanoto =

Indonesian businesswoman

Belinda Tanoto is an Indonesian businesswoman and the younger daughter of Sukanto Tanoto and Tinah Bingei Tanoto, founders of the Tanoto Foundation. Since 2009, she has served as a trustee of the Foundation, a philanthropic organization focused on poverty reduction through education and community programs. Tanoto holds a bachelor's degree from the University of Pennsylvania and an MBA from Harvard Business School.

== Education ==
Tanoto graduated magna cum laude from the Wharton School wof the University of Pennsylvania, earning a bachelor's degree in finance and political science. She later obtained an MBA from Harvard Business School. In October 2017, she and her siblings were named to The Wharton School's "40 Under 40" list, which recognizes outstanding young Wharton alumni.

== Career ==
After graduation, Tanoto worked for one year as an analyst at Morgan Stanley. Tanoto is currently a member of the Management Committee of RGE-managed Apical Group, which is part of Royal Golden Eagle (RGE)'s palm oil business. In this role, she is responsible for the management of the palm oil group.

== Other work ==
In addition to her business career, Tanoto is also involved with the Tanoto Foundation, an organization co-founded by her family.

Since 2009, Tanoto has directed the Foundation's investments in rural schools in Indonesia.

Around 2017, Tanoto collaborated with other philanthropists and various aid agencies, including the United Nations Development Programme, on issues of rural poverty.
