= Asia Pacific Rayon =

Indonesian textile company

- Company type: Private
- Industry: Textile manufacturing
- Headquarters: Indonesia
- Products: Viscose rayon
- Parent: Royal Golden Eagle
- Website: aprayon.com

Asia Pacific Rayon (APR) is a viscose-rayon producers based in Pangkalan Kerinci, Riau, Indonesia. It has an annual capacity of 300,000 tons of viscose-rayon. The company produces renewable and biodegradable viscose-rayon, which is made from wood cellulose, and serves as an alternative to fossil-based synthetics in the textile industry. It is one of Royal Golden Eagle's (RGE's) business groups.

== Business ==
APR is the largest integrated rayon factory in Indonesia. Most of its supply comes from pulp and paper producer APRIL. It claims its "from plantation to fashion" integrated value chain supports the nation's "Making Indonesia 4.0" economic roadmap, which aims to boost competitiveness in, among many, five priority sectors: Food and drinks, automotive, textile, electronics, and chemicals.

The company produces viscose-rayon, commonly used in textile products. APR's products are exported to 17 countries including Brazil, Turkey, Pakistan, Sri Lanka, Bangladesh various parts of Europe.

In a collaboration with the International Chamber of Commerce and Singapore-based blockchain startup Perlin Net Group, APR on 9 April 2019 launched 'Follow Our Fibre', a blockchain project on viscose supply chain traceability.

In 2020 APR opened Jakarta Fashion Hub to encourage collaboration and growth in the Indonesian fashion and textile industry.

== Sustainability ==
APR’s operations have been 100% powered by renewable energy since 2020.

In 2021 APR launched APR2030, a series of sustainability targets to be achieved by 2030, including halving product carbon intensity and the introduction of 20% recycled content in its Viscose Staple Fibre (VSF).

In 2022 RGE and Nanyang Technological University in Singapore launched the RGE-NTU Sustainable Textile Research Centre (RGE-NTU SusTex) to advance the research of recycling technologies in urban environments.

APR achieved EU-BAT compliance in 2024, meaning it meets Best Available Techniques Associated Emission Levels (BAT-AEL) in areas including material usage, water management, wastewater treatment and air emissions.
