= Pelalawan Regency =

Regency in Riau, Indonesia

Coordinates: 0°16′00″N 101°40′01″E

Pelalawan Regency Kabupaten Pelalawan
- Regency
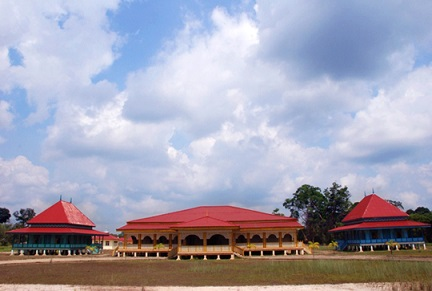
- The Pelalawan palace

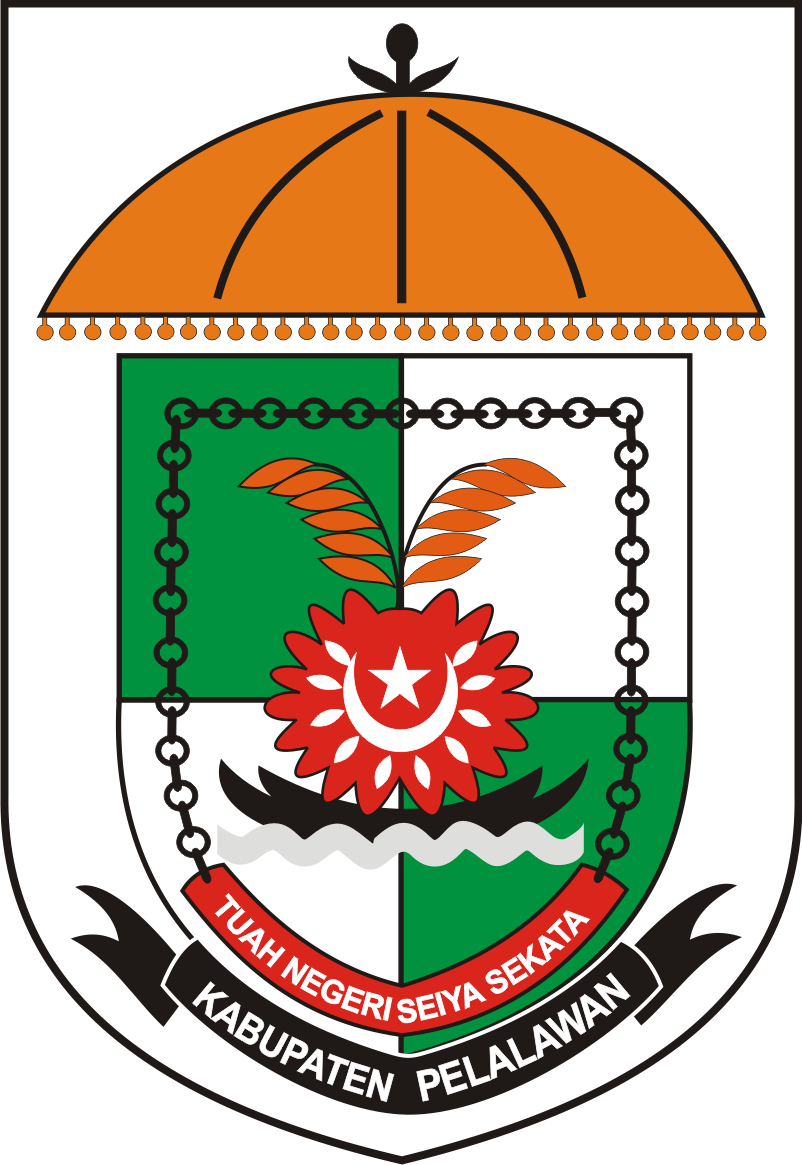
- Coat of arms

- Country: Indonesia
- Province: Riau
- Regency seat: Pangkalan Kerinci

Government
  - Regent: Zukri Misran
  - Vice Regent: Husni Tamrin

Area
  - Total: 13,408.72 km^{2} (5,177.14 sq mi)

Population (2025 estimate)
  - Total: 452,667
  - Density: 33.7592/km^{2} (87.4358/sq mi)
- Time zone: UTC+7 (WIB)
- Website: pelalawankab.go.id

Pelalawan is a regency (kabupaten) of Riau Province, Indonesia. It is located on the island of Sumatra. The regency was created on 12 October 1999 as a result of the division of Kampar Regency, of which it was previously the eastern 43%. It now has an area of 13,408.72 km^{2} and had a population of 301,829 at the 2010 Census and 390,046 at the 2020 Census; the official estimate as at mid 2025 was 452,667 (comprising 233,025 males and 219,642 females). The administrative centre of the regency is in the large town of Pangkalan Kerinci, with 101,355 inhabitants in mid 2024.

== Administrative districts ==
The regency is divided into twelve districts (kecamatan), listed below with their areas and their populations at the 2010 Census and the 2020 Census, together with the official estimates as at mid 2025. The table also includes the locations of the district administrative centres, the number of administrative villages in each district (totaling rural desa and 14 urban kelurahan), and its post code; of the 14 kelurahan, one is in each district (the district administrative centre as named below in each case), except that the very urbanised Pangkalan Kerinci District has three kelurahan.

Kode Wilayah	Name of District (kecamatan)	Area in km^{2}	Pop'n Census 2010	Pop'n Census 2020	Pop'n Estimate mid 2025	Admin centre	No. of villages	Post code
14.05.05	Langgam	1,535.26	21,968	32,997	39,326	Langgam	8	28380
14.05.02	Pangkalan Kerinci	223.45	69,444	94,585	114,687	Pangkalan Kerinci	7 ^{(a)}	28381
14.05.11	Bandar Sei Kijang	408.23	17,175	21,481	23,884	Sekijang	5	28383
14.05.03	Pangkalan Kuras	1,193.58	45,072	61,123	73,513	Sorek Satu	17	28382
14.05.01	Ukui	1,293.17	32,293	40,298	46,693	Ukui Satu	12	28388
14.05.04	Pangkalan Lesung	509.28	25,251	29,832	31,784	Pangkalan Lesung	10	28387
14.05.08	Bunut	423.00	11,754	15,465	17,087	Pangkalan Bunut	10	28386
14.05.06	Pelalawan (district)	1,368.77	15,388	19,120	21,897	Pelalawan	9	28353
14.05.12	Bandar Petalangan	372.30	12,635	16,447	18,187	Rawang Empat	11	28384
14.05.10	Kuala Kampar ^{(b)}	757.21	17,622	17,837	18,577	Teluk Dalam	10	28385
14.05.07	Kerumutan	1,002.78	19,115	24,420	26,980	Kerumutan	10	28352
14.05.09	Teluk Meranti (Meranti Bay)	4,321.64	14,112	16,441	20,052	Teluk Meranti	9	28354
	Totals	13,408.72	301,829	390,046	452,667	Pangkalan Kerinci	118	

Note: (a) the three kelurahan in the centre of this district (with mid 2024 populations) are Pangkalan Kerinci Timur (50,255), Pangkalan Kerinci Kota (42,051) and Pangkalan Kerinci Barat (9,049). Of the four desa in the district, Makmur and Mekar Jaya are situated to the north of the town, and Kuala Terusan and Rantau Baru to the south of the town.
(b) seven of the ten villages of this district comprise the offshore island of Pulau Mendol, with a land area of 445.12 km^{2} and with 13,721 inhabitants in mid 2024.
