= Tanoto Foundation =

Indonesian philanthropic organization

- Formation: 2001; 25 years ago
- Founders: Sukanto Tanoto; Tinah Bingei Tanoto
- Region served: Asia
- Key people: Sukanto Tanoto (Board of Trustees); Tinah Bingei Tanoto (Board of Trustees); Andre Tanoto (Board of Trustees); Imelda Tanoto (Board of Trustees); Belinda Tanoto (Board of Trustees); Anderson Tanoto (Board of Trustees); Bey Soo Khiang (Chairman)
- Website: TanotoFoundation.org

Tanoto Foundation is an independent family owned philanthropocal organisation whose work began in 1981 and was formally founded by Indonesian entrepreneur Sukanto Tanoto, and his wife Tinah Bingei Tanoto in 2001.

== History ==
Sukanto Tanoto and his wife Tinah Bingei funded the construction of a kindergarten and elementary school in Besitang, North Sumatra in 1981. Subsequent philanthropic activities were mostly aimed at improving education amenities and infrastructure in impoverished rural areas of Sumatra. Tanoto Foundation was later formally incorporated as a non-profit charitable organisation in 2001, and expanded its operations to include training teachers, improving educational facilities, providing scholarships, and supporting medical research. It is privately funded by the family of Sukanto Tanoto.

In 2018 the foundation announced a refreshed strategy including four targets:

- Contribute to the reduction of the stunting rate in Indonesia to below 20% by 2030
- Help Indonesia become one of the five most improved countries in the OECD's Programme for International Student Assessment (PISA) ranking system by 2030
- Catalyse preventive and integrative medical research efforts into Asian prevalent diseases to extend the average health span of Asians by five years, by 2030
- Support the development of a community of leaders who are making a positive impact on society

== Activities in Indonesia ==
In 2010, Tanoto Foundation launched the Pelita Pendidikan program to improve the quality of rural education in Indonesia. Pelita Pendidikan aimed to improve the quality of teaching, improve the qualification and competency of teachers, and provide adequate facilities in schools. In 2018, Pelita Pendidikan was renamed PINTAR and expanded to cover schools in urban areas.

In Jakarta, Tanoto Foundation opened the Acacia Child-Friendly Integrated Public Space (RPTRA) in 2016. The 2,400 square metre area includes a library, children's playground, gardens and multipurpose facilities to help provide more opportunities for early childhood development.

Tanoto Foundation is also a prominent disburser of higher education scholarships in Indonesia, supporting more than 7,000 students as of 2018 at 28 Indonesian universities through its National Championship Scholarship program. In 2018 the program was renamed TELADAN, which means ‘role model’ in Indonesian. Scholarship recipients have their tuition paid and undergo additional leadership training. As part of TELADAN's focus on leadership training, the number of university partners was reduced to nine.

In 2016, Tanoto Foundation agreed to fund a pilot project between UNDP Indonesia and the provincial government in Riau to implement the Sustainable Development Goals at a local level.

In 2018, Tanoto Foundation was appointed by Filantropi Indonesia as the inaugural leader of the Education Cluster, a newly created voluntary association of philanthropies and government bodies designed to promote partnership to improve the quality of the country's education system.

Tanoto Foundation contributed to the emergency response after the 2018 Sulawesi earthquake and tsunami, providing aircraft to help medical teams reach the area, and donating IDR1 billion to provide medicine and other necessities.

In 2023, Tanoto Foundation, together with UNESCO, held the UNESCO Youth as Researchers and Tanoto Student Research Awards (YAR-TSRA) Knowledge Summit in Jakarta. This summit brought together over one hundred students as the culmination of twelve weeks of workshops organized by YAR-TSRA in collaboration with six Indonesian universities to foster evidence-based multidisciplinary research and policy recommendations on topics including climate change, inclusive education, youth participation, and sustainable AI.

== Activities in Singapore ==
In Singapore, Tanoto Foundation's efforts have largely focused on tertiary education scholarship disbursements, education infrastructure development, art and cultural development, and medical research funding.

In 2007, the foundation helped established the Tanoto Foundation Centre for Southeast Asian Arts in Nanyang Academy of Fine Arts.

The foundation also supports medical research into diseases prevalent in Asian populations through:

- A S$3 million gift in 2014 to SingHealth Duke-NUS to identify new ways of diagnosing, stratifying and testing cardiovascular diseases, thereby allowing early prevention for those who are genetically predisposed to the disease. Out of the S$3 million gift, S$2.5 million was used to set up the Tanoto Foundation Professorship in Cardiovascular Medicine, which was awarded to Professor Stuart Cook The remaining S$500,000 funded the Tanoto Foundation Initiative for Genetics and Stem Cell Research at National Heart Research Institute Singapore (NHRIS)
- The Tanoto Foundation Professorship in Medical Oncology at SingHealth Duke-NUS, awarded to Associate Professor Lim Soon Thye from the Oncology Academic Clinical Programme in 2016. The S$2.5 million gift is intended to advance research in medical oncology
- A $2 million donation in 2017 to support the Viral Research and Experimental Medicine Centre at SingHealth Duke-NUS (ViREMiCS), which uses molecular techniques and other new technology to shorten clinical trials and bring new drugs and vaccines to market more rapidly

== Activities in China ==
In 2016, Tanoto Foundation donated RMB 100 million to fund talent training initiatives over 10 years between China and countries in the Belt and Road Initiative.
