= Lyocell =

Regenerated cellulose fibre made from dissolving pulp

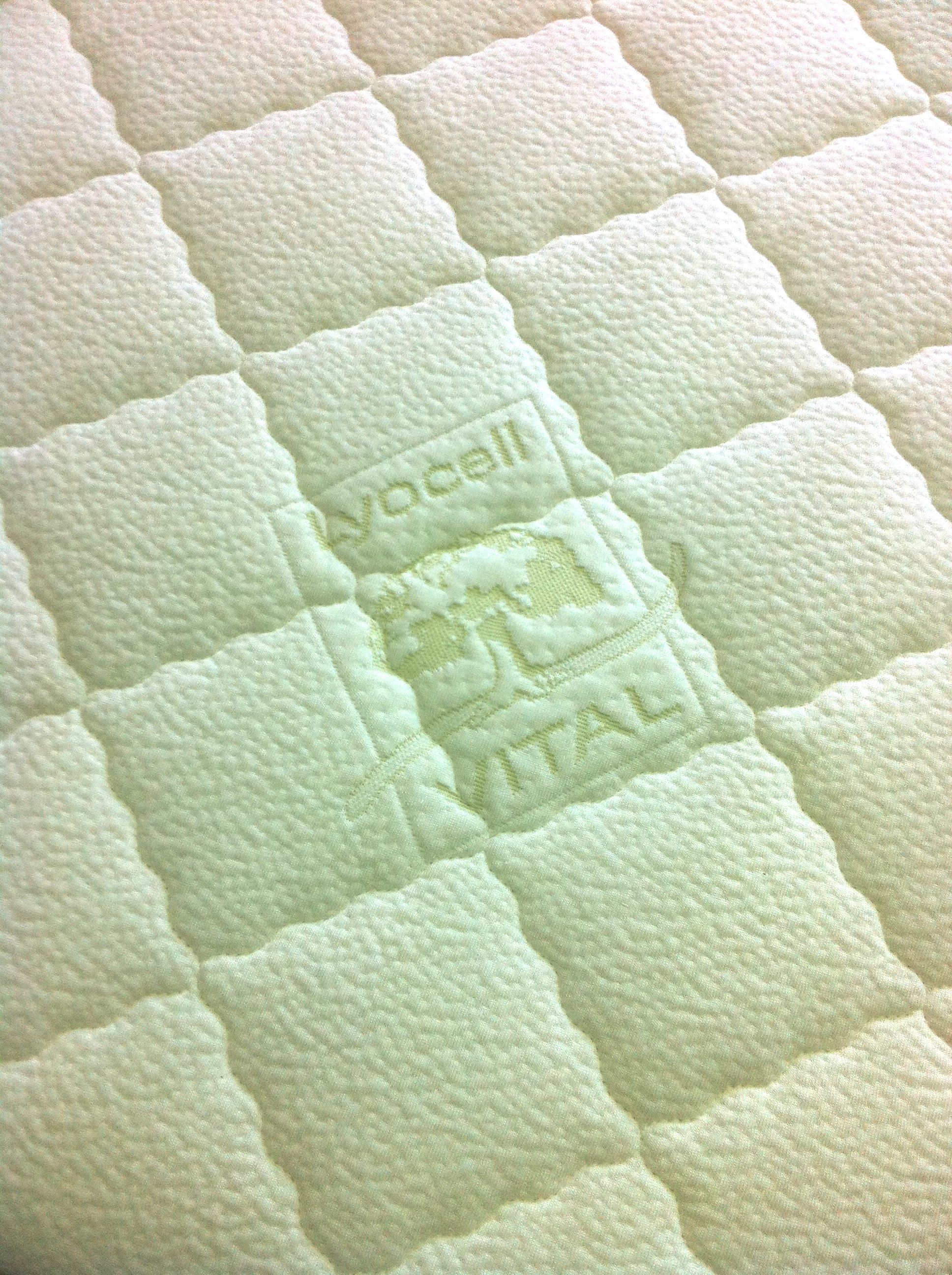
Mattress with Lyocell as cover material

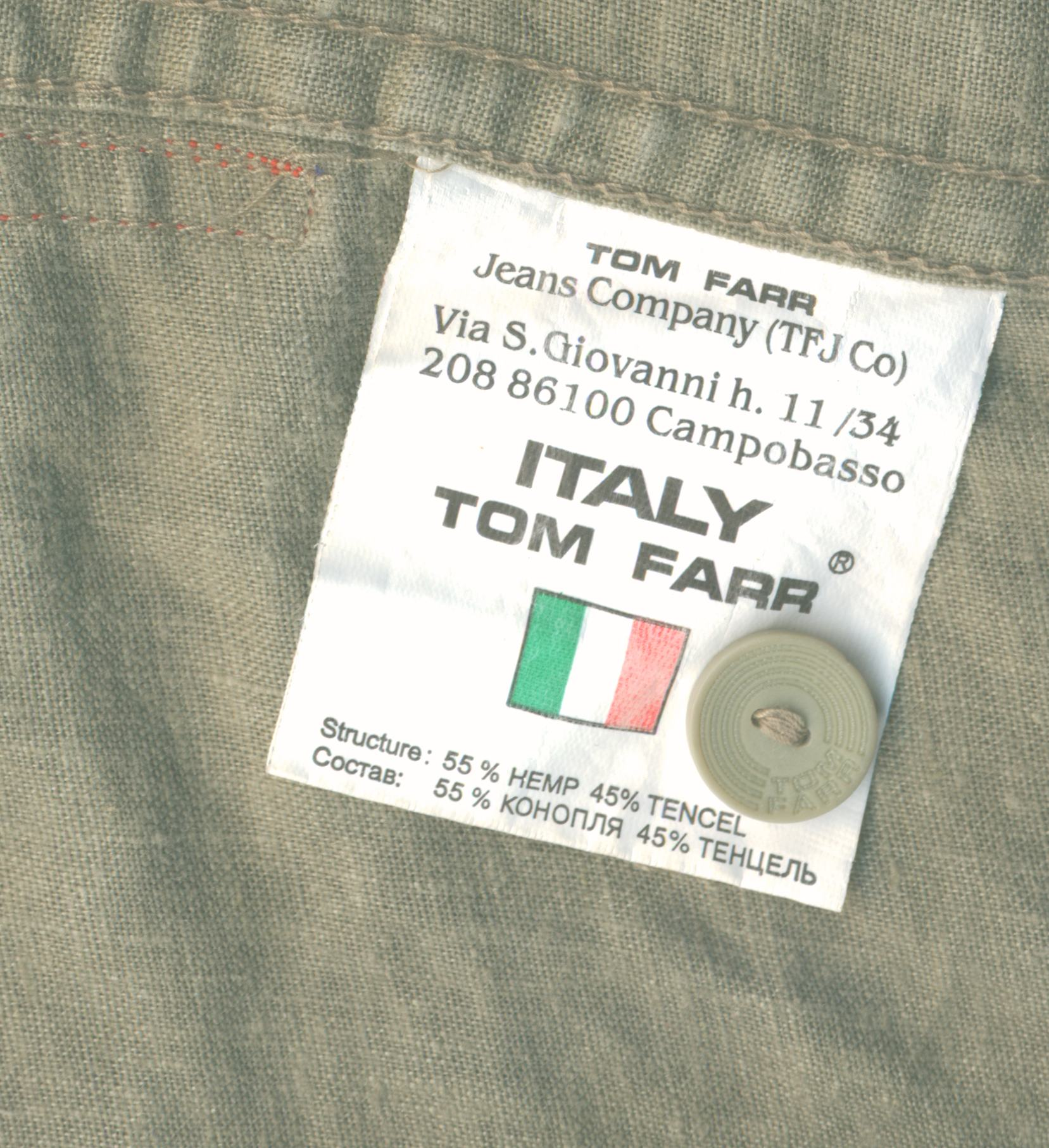
Label of a coat containing Tencel (a brand of Lyocell)

Lyocell is a semi-synthetic fibre used to make textiles for clothing and other purposes. It is a form of regenerated cellulose made by dissolving pulp and dry jet-wet spinning. Unlike rayon, which is made by the more common viscose processes, Lyocell production does not use carbon disulfide, which is toxic to workers and the environment. Lyocell was originally trademarked as Tencel in 1992.

"Lyocell" has become a genericised trademark used to refer to the Lyocell process for making cellulose fibres. The United States Federal Trade Commission defines Lyocell as "a fiber composed of cellulose precipitated from an organic solution in which no substitution of the hydroxy groups takes place, and no chemical intermediates are formed". It classifies the fibre as a sub-category of rayon.

== Names ==
Other trademarked names for Lyocell fibres are Tencel (Lenzing AG), Newcell (Akzo Nobel), and Seacell (Zimmer AG). The Aditya Birla Group also sells it under the brand name Excel. There are other manufacturers, such as Sateri, who sell their product under the generic name Lyocell.

== History ==
The development of Tencel was motivated by environmental concerns; researchers sought to manufacture rayon by means less harmful than the viscose method.

The Lyocell process was developed in 1972 by a team at the now defunct American Enka fibres facility at Enka, North Carolina. In 2003, the American Association of Textile Chemists and Colorists (AATCC) awarded Neal E. Franks their Henry E. Millson Award for Invention for Lyocell. In 1966–1968, D. L. Johnson of Eastman Kodak Inc. studied NMMO solutions. From 1969 to 1979, American Enka tried unsuccessfully to commercialise the process. The operating name for the fibre inside the Enka organisation was "Newcell", and the development was carried through a pilot plant scale before the work was stopped.

The basic process of dissolving cellulose in NMMO was first described in a 1981 patent by McCorsley for Akzona Incorporated (the holding company of Akzo). In the 1980s the patent was licensed by Akzo to Courtaulds and Lenzing.

The fibre was developed by Courtaulds Fibres under the brand name "Tencel" in the 1980s. In 1982, a 100-kg/week pilot plant was built in Coventry, England, and production increased tenfold (to a ton/week) in 1984. In 1988, a 25-ton/week semi-commercial production line opened at the Grimsby, UK, pilot plant.

The process was first commercialised at Courtaulds' rayon factories at Mobile, Alabama (1990), and at the Grimsby plant (1998). In January 1993 the Mobile Tencel plant reached full production levels of 20,000 tons per year, by which time Courtaulds had spent £100 million and 10 years on Tencel development. Tencel revenues for 1993 were estimated as likely to be £50 million. The second plant in Mobile was planned. By 2004 production had quadrupled to 80,000 tons.

Lenzing began a pilot plant in 1990, and commercial production in 1997, with 12 metric tonnes/year made in a plant in Heiligenkreuz im Lafnitztal, Austria. When an explosion hit the plant in 2003 it was producing 20,000 tonnes/year, and planning to double capacity by the end of the year. In 2004 Lenzing was producing 40,000 tons [sic, probably metric tonnes]. In 1998 Lenzing and Courtaulds reached a patent dispute settlement.

In 1998 Courtaulds was acquired by their competitor Akzo Nobel, who combined the Tencel division with other fibre divisions under the Acordis banner, then sold them to private equity firm CVC Partners. In 2000 CVC sold the Tencel division to Lenzing AG, who combined it with their "Lenzing Lyocell" business, but maintained the brand name Tencel. They took over the plants in Mobile and Grimsby, and by 2015 was the largest Lyocell producer at 130,000 tonnes/year.

== Uses ==
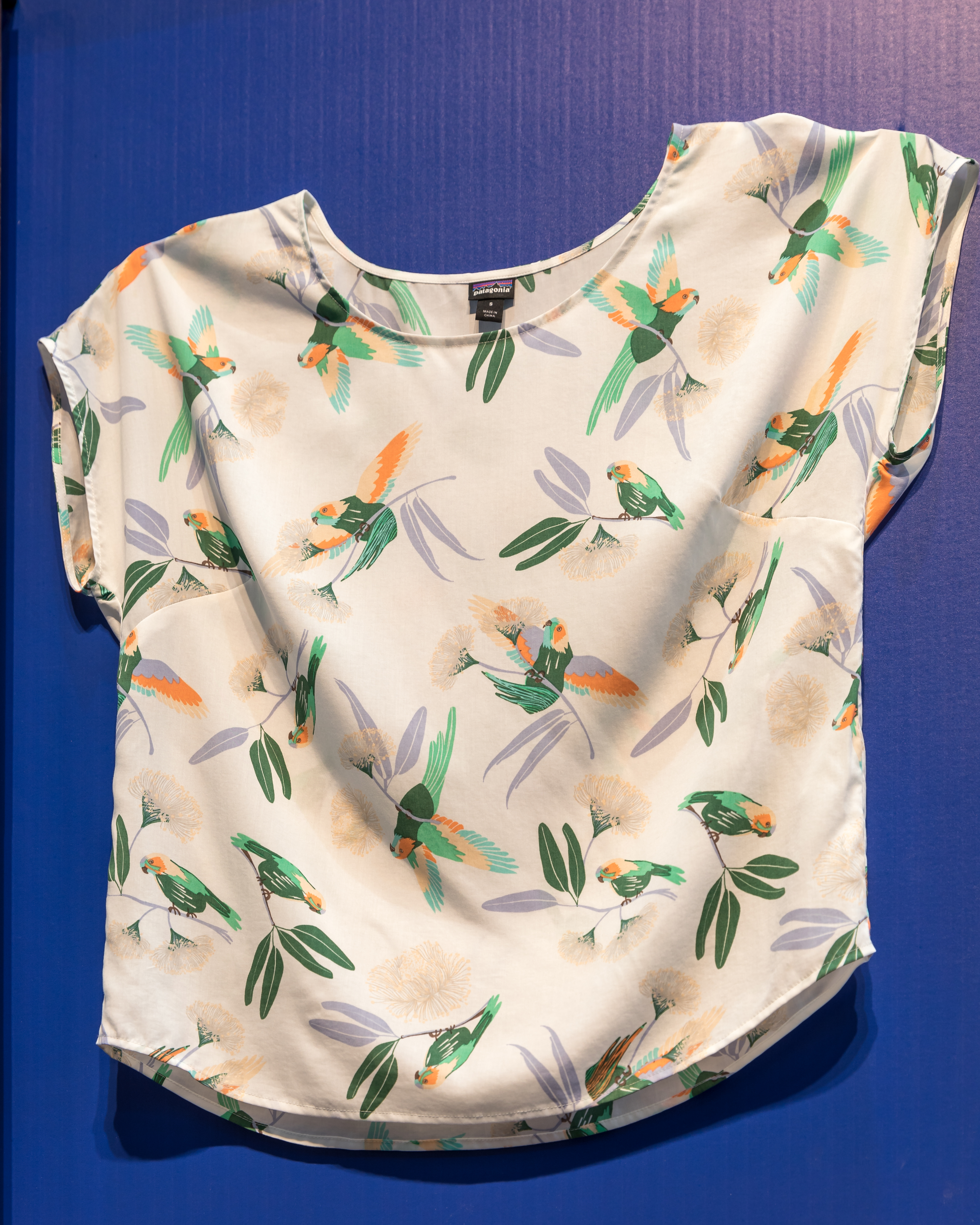
Shirt made from Lyocell

Lyocell is used in many everyday fabrics. Staple fibres are used in clothes such as denim, chino, underwear, casual wear, and towels. Filament fibres, which are generally longer and smoother than staple fibres, are used in items that have a silkier appearance such as women's clothing and men's dress shirts. Lyocell may be blended with a variety of other fibres such as silk, cotton, rayon, polyester, linen, nylon, and wool. When cotton or polyester are mixed with tencel, the resulting fabric is much stronger and more resistant to wear, tear, and pilling than cotton or polyester on their own. Lyocell also is used in conveyor belts, speciality papers, and medical dressings.

== Properties ==
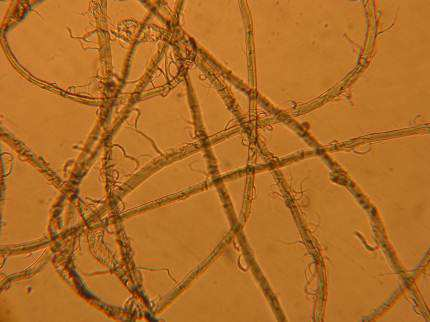
Fibrillation of Lyocell may produce a "peach-fuzz" feel.

Lyocell shares many properties with other fibres such as cotton, linen, silk, ramie, hemp, and viscose rayon (to which it is very closely related chemically). Lyocell is 50% more absorbent than cotton, and has a longer wicking distance compared to modal fabrics of a similar weave.

Compared to cotton, consumers often say Lyocell fibres feel softer and "airier", due to their better ability to wick moisture. Industry claims of higher resistance to wrinkling are as yet unsupported. Lyocell fabric may be machine washed or dry cleaned. It drapes well and may be dyed many colours, needing slightly less dye than cotton to achieve the same depth of colour.

== Manufacturing process ==
The Lyocell process uses a direct solvent rather than indirect dissolution such as the xanthation-regeneration route in the viscose process. Lyocell fibre is produced from dissolving pulp, which contains cellulose in high purity with little hemicellulose and no lignin. Hardwood logs (such as oak and birch) are chipped into squares about the size of postage stamps. The chips are digested chemically, either with the prehydrolysis-kraft process or with sulfite process, to remove the lignin and hemicellulose. The pulp is bleached to remove the remaining traces of lignin, dried into a continuous sheet and rolled onto spools. The pulp has the consistency of thick posterboard paper and is delivered in rolls weighing some 500 lb (230 kg).

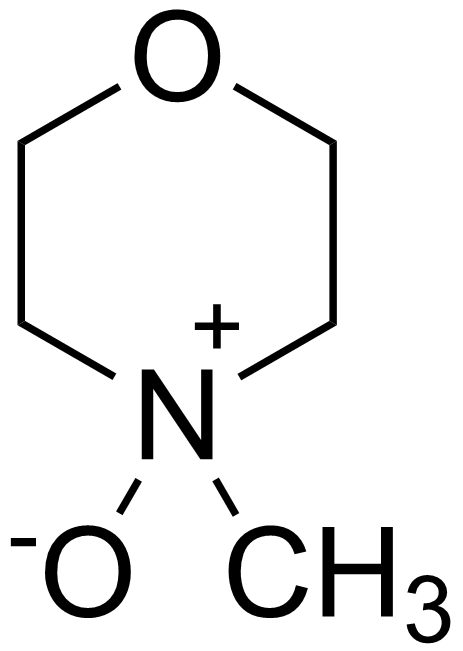
N-Methylmorpholine N-oxide is a key solvent in the Lyocell process

At a factory, rolls of pulp are broken into one-inch squares and dissolved in N-methylmorpholine N-oxide (NMMO), giving a solution called "dope". The filtered cellulose solution is then pumped through spinnerets, devices used with a variety of synthetic fibres. The spinneret is pierced with small holes similar to a shower head; when the solution is forced through it, continuous strands of filament come out. The fibres are drawn in air to align the cellulose molecules, giving the Lyocell fibres its characteristic high strength. The fibres are then immersed in a water bath, where desolvation of the cellulose sets the fibre strands. The bath contains dilute amine oxide in a steady state concentration. Then the fibres are washed with demineralised water. Next, the Lyocell fibre passes to a drying area, where the water is evaporated from it.

Manufacturing of Lyocell then follows the same route as other kinds of fibres, such as viscose. The strands pass to a finishing area where a lubricant, which may be a soap, silicone, or other agents depending on the future use of the fibre, is applied. This acts as a detangler prior to carding and spinning the fibre into yarn. At this stage the dried, finished fibres are in a form called tow, a large, untwisted bundle of continuous lengths of filament. The bundles of tow are taken to a crimper, a machine that compresses the fibre, giving it texture and bulk. The crimped fibre is then carded by mechanical carders, which perform a combing action to separate and order the strands. The carded strands are then cut and baled for shipment to a fabric mill. The entire manufacturing process, from unrolling the raw cellulose to baling the fibre, takes roughly two hours. After this, the Lyocell may be processed in many ways. It may be spun with another fibre, such as cotton or wool. The resulting yarn can be woven or knitted like any other fabric, and may be given a variety of finishes, from soft and suede-like to silky.

The amine oxide used to dissolve the cellulose and set the fibre after spinning (NMMO) is recycled. Typically, 99 per cent of the amine oxide is recovered. NMMO biodegrades without producing harmful products. Since there is little waste product, this process is claimed to be relatively eco-friendly. However, it is energy-intensive and the solvent NMMO is a petrochemical.

=== Future research ===
Lyocell's lack of antibacterial properties limits its uses in the medical field, however due to its biodegradability, low toxicity, and comfort, Lyocell could become a useful material for antibacterial garments. Several approaches have been tested to introduce antibacterial capabilities. Three general approaches have been studied to achieve this: physical blending, chemical reaction, and post-treatment. Physical blending methods introduce antibacterial agents into the spinning dope. In chemical reaction methods, antibacterial additives are crosslinked into the Lyocell fibre, therefore giving it antimicrobial properties. In post-treatment methods, antibacterial additives are deposited on Lyocell fibre surfaces through physical coating, padding, or impregnation processes. Physical blending and post-treatment methods appear to be the most promising for large-scale manufacturing. Careful consideration of cost, preparation time, and antibacterial effectiveness is required to choose the best method. Creating successful modification of Lyocell fibres to enhance antibacterial properties would allow for the manufacturing of products for health care (such as lab coats, caps, gowns), hygiene products (scrubs, sanitary napkins), and clothing (socks, underwear).

== See also ==
- Modal (textile)

== Sources ==
- Kadolph, Sara J.; Langford, Anna (2001). Textiles. Prentice Hall. ISBN 978-0-13-025443-6.
- Yates, Marypaul (2002). Fabrics: A Hanbook For Interior Designers And Architects. W. W. Norton & Company. ISBN 978-0-393-73062-3.
