= Sateri =

Manufacturer of viscose rayon

- Company type: Business division (former public)
- Industry: Manufacturing
- Predecessor: Sateri Holdings Limited; Bracell Limited
- Founded: 2002
- Headquarters: Shanghai, China
- Products: viscose yarns, lyocell
- Owner: Royal Golden Eagle
- Parent: Royal Golden Eagle
- Website: www.sateri.com

Sateri is a producer of viscose rayon and lyocell, with an annual production capacity of 2.4 million tonnes. It operates 15 mills in China. Sateri is a business group of Royal Golden Eagle (RGE).

== History ==
=== Sateri ===
Sateri is a business group of Royal Golden Eagle and was founded by entrepreneur and philanthropist Sukanto Tanoto.

Sateri started operating in 2002 when it began building a viscose staple fibre (VSF) mill near the city of Jiujiang in southeastern China. Sateri (Jiangxi) Chemical Fibre Co Ltd's plant went into commercial production in 2004.

In 2010, Sukanto Tanoto established an intermediate holding company Sateri Holdings. In the same year, Sateri Holdings became a listed company in the Hong Kong stock exchange. The listed company owned the wood pulp and viscose staple fiber factories in Brazil and China respectively.

Sateri's second plant – Sateri (Fujian) Fibre Co. Ltd in Putian – opened in 2013.

In 2014, the listed company, Sateri Holdings, sold their Chinese factories to their controlling shareholder. Those factories were under the Sateri business division. Soon after, the listed company was renamed to Bracell Limited. However, the listed company was also privatized in 2016.

In June 2015, Sateri launched its third mill in China – Sateri (Jiujiang) Fibre Co. Ltd. – by completing the acquisition of a plant from Jiangxi Longda.

In May 2016, Sateri China Holdings bought a controlling stake in Linz (Nanjing) Viscose Yarn Co. Ltd. The spinning mill, set up in 2007 by Austria's Linz Textil, makes high-quality viscose yarn products that are exported worldwide.

In April 2019 Sateri acquired its fourth mill, the Jiangsu Xiangsheng Viscose Fiber company.

In May 2020 Sateri entered the lyocell market with a 20,000 tonne per annum production line in Rizhao, Shandong.

Sateri’s lyocell capacity has continued to expand, reaching 400,000 tonnes in 2025.

== Operations ==
According to the company, it does not use wood pulp from natural, ancient or endangered forests, forests of high conservation value or high carbon stock, or habitats of endangered species. Sateri's Pulp Sourcing Policy and Sustainability Policy apply to all of its dissolving wood pulp suppliers.

The three plants in China have Chain of Custody certification from the Programme for the Endorsement of Forest Certification (PEFC) and are certified under ISO 9001 and ISO 14001. The company has stated that it has Swiss-based Oeko-Tex certification and describes its fiber products as "free from harmful substances" while "complies with European Union regulations."

In the same year, Sateri, together with nine leading global viscose producers and two trade associations, founded the ‘Collaboration for Sustainable Development of Viscose’ (CV), an industry initiative to address sustainability challenges and drive market transformation.

As part of the Royal Golden Eagle (RGE) group, Sateri plans to invest US$200 million over the next ten years into cellulosic textile fiber research and development. The investment revealed ahead of the Textile Exchange Sustainability Conference in Vancouver will support alternative cellulose or plant-based feedstock and closed-loop manufacturing solutions.

Following the announcement, Sateri achieved a breakthrough in the commercial production of viscose using recycled textile waste in March 2020. This is followed by the unveiling of Sateri’s Finex as its new product brand for recycled fiber. Finex, short for ‘Fibre Next,’ is an innovative next-generation cellulosic fiber-containing recycled content.

In May 2020, Sateri began Lyocell production in Rizhao, Shandong, China.

== Ownership ==
Sateri's businesses were previously listed as "Sateri Holdings Limited" on the Hong Kong stock exchange from 2010 to 2016. Sateri Holdings, as of 2010, was majority owned by Sukanto Tanoto and his family.

In 2014 Sateri Holdings VSF businesses in China, were sold to Royal Golden Eagle, which was also controlled by the majority shareholder of the listed company, Sukanto Tanoto. The listed company was renamed to "Bracell Limited" on 30 January 2015 and then also privatised by Royal Golden Eagle in October 2016.
