= Key Witness (book) =

2013 book by Metta Dharmasaputra

- First edition
- Author: Metta Dharmasaputra
- Original title: Saksi Kunci
- Language: English
- Publisher: Tempo
- Publication date: 2013
- Publication place: Indonesia
- Media type: Soft Cover
- Pages: 446
- ISBN: 978-602-14105-0-9
- OCLC: 896813501

Key Witness is a book on Asian Agri Group's tax evasion.

Originally written in Indonesia language under the title Saksi Kunci, its author is former Tempo journalist Metta Dharmasaputra.

== Narrative ==
Vincent is former Group Financial Controller of the dozen-odd oil palm plantation companies under the Asian Agri Group owned by Sukanto Tanoto, Indonesia's richest man. Asian Agri is one of the holding companies within Royal Golden Eagle (previously known as Raja Garuda Mas), which operates palm oil, cocoa and rubber plantations—one of the biggest such companies in the world.

Sukanto's business group is a global conglomerate. Under the RGE umbrella, it has more than US$12 billion in total assets, and at least 50,000 employees, with offices in Singapore, Hong Kong, Jakarta, Beijing and Nanjing. It has operations in China, Indonesia, Finland, the Philippines, and Brazil.

From his hiding place in Singapore, Vincent revealed that the total amount of taxes evaded by 14 oil palm plantation companies under the Asian Agri umbrella or the total losses to the state came to IDR1.3 trillion (around US$115 million), making it the largest tax scandal in Indonesia's history. This tax evasion was committed during 2002-2005. Three modus operandi of tax evasion used by Asian Agri are creating fictitious expenses, price manipulation through a transfer pricing scheme, and fictitious hedging transactions. These manipulations were then channeled through a number of foreign companies also owned by Sukanto, in places such as Singapore, Hong Kong, Mauritius, Macao and the British Virgin Islands.

Vincent leaked this confidential information to Metta from his exile in Singapore, after his theft of funds from the company of US$3.1 million was exposed. He contemplated suicide, but was finally persuaded to return to Jakarta in an intelligence operation carried out by the Corruption Eradication Commission. Key Witness tells of the many struggles surrounding the disclosure of the Asian Agri tax case. Metta's cell phone was tapped. Tempo, which published the investigative reports on the case, was taken to court. Vincent was sentenced to 11 years in prison for money laundering, a crime he had not committed. It took the tax authorities several years to get the case tried. Finally, the Supreme Court sentenced Asian Agri to pay a fine of IDR2.5 trillion (US$227 million), the largest fine ever in Indonesia's legal history.

Asian Agri has paid all fines to the state of IDR 2.5 trillion in October 2–14. In addition, Asian Agri is also obliged to pay tax arrears—including its fine—to the Directorate General of Taxation of IDR2 trillion, but it's still pending until the appeal process at the Tax Court has been decided.
