= Royal Golden Eagle =

Indonesian company

- Type: Private
- Industry: Pulp, paper, Rayon
- Founder: Sukanto Tanoto
- Headquarters: Singapore
- Area served: Worldwide
- Products: Packaging, paper, tissue, Rayon
- Website: www.rgei.com

Royal Golden Eagle (RGE; also known as Raja Garuda Emas, previously Raja Garuda Mas) is a global integrated, resource-based industrial group, with businesses in paper, palm oil, viscose, construction and energy, property and asset management. Owned by Indonesian businessman Sukanto Tanoto, the group employs 80,000 people worldwide with assets exceeding US$40 billion.

== History ==
Sukanto Tanoto founded his first business in 1967, supplying spare parts to the oil and construction industries in Indonesia, before winning contracts in building gas pipelines for multinationals in 1972. His business grew considerably following the 1973 oil crisis when he open his own plywood mill in Indonesia. He diversified into palm oil in 1979. Since 1985, Tanoto’s companies have planted 30,000 acres of palm oil plantation each year, with plantations spread over three provinces in Sumatra with a total land area of 160,000 hectares. He listed the public pulp and paper business Asia Pacific Resources International Holdings (APRIL) on the New York Stock Exchange in 1995, delisting it in 2001. The company moved its base to Singapore in 1997 in order to mitigate the effects of a global travel ban that had been placed upon Indonesia at the time. In 2011 APRIL became a founding member of the Indonesia Business Council for Sustainable Development.

== Business structure ==
From its base in Singapore, the company conducts activities across four business sectors: pulp and paper; agro industry; dissolving wood pulp and viscose staple fibre; and energy resource development.

=== Asia Pacific Resources International Holdings Limited (APRIL) ===
Located in the Riau province of Indonesia, APRIL operates one of the world’s largest pulp and paper mills. With an annual pulp production capacity of 2.8 million tons and an annual fine paper production capacity of 820,000 tons, it generates employment opportunities for 90,000 local people and represents 6.9% of Riau Province’s economic output (2009).

In 2024, APRIL acquired Vinda International.

=== Asia Symbol ===
Established in Shandong and Guangdong, China in 2005, Asia Symbol has an annual production capacity of 1.5 million tons of pulp, 450,000 tons of fine paper and 520,000 tons of paper board. Its Shandong plant operates the world’s largest single pulp production line, with state-of-the-art manufacturing technology and environment protection practices.

BoardOne (博旺 in Chinese) is the main brand of paperboard products produced by the Shandong mill. It includes several types of packaging, including packaging for food, tobacco, and pharmaceuticals products. BoardOne can be found in Europe, Americas, ME and Asia market. BoardOne is featured with printability, and runnability on high speed packaging lines.

There are two lines producing BoardOne products. BM11 has a web width of 3.6m, grammage range of 190-380g, main products are FBB and SBS; BM12 has a web width of 4.6m, grammage range of 170-400g, mainly LPB, cigarette packaging boards and food packaging/service boards (cup stock and cup plate etc.).

There are two pulp lines located in Shandong mill. BHKP and BSKP can be supplied internally for BoardOne board making.

=== Asian Agri ===
Asian Agri is one of Asia’s largest palm oil producers, with an annual crude palm oil production capacity of one million tons with 28 oil palm plantations, 19 palm oil mills and 160,000 hectares of palm plantation.

=== Apical Group Limited ===
Apical, with operations in Indonesia and China, is one Indonesia's largest exporters of palm oil with refining, processing and trading of palm oil for both domestic use and international export. The company's operations in include four refineries, a biodiesel plant and a crushing plant.

=== Bracell ===
Bracell is one of the largest specialty cellulose producers in the world. Its operations are in Brazil. It produces different grades of specialty cellulose.

It was formerly known as Sateri Holdings Limited, which undergone a name change on February 26, 2015. Bracell was privatized on Oct 24, 2016.

RGE completed the acquisition of Lwarcel Celulose from Lwart Group on Aug 31, 2018. Lwarcel will be managed under Bracell Group.

=== Sateri ===
Sateri is a viscose staple fiber producers, with a design annual production capacity of 1.4 million tonnes of viscose staple fiber.

In 2018, Sateri reported to have three mills with a combined capacity of 600,000 metric tonnes, making it the largest viscose producer in China and third largest in the world.

=== Asia Pacific Rayon ===
Asia Pacific Rayon is the first fully integrated viscose rayon producer in Asia, with a 240,000-tonne capacity mill located in Pangkalan Kerinci.

=== Pacific Energy ===
Pacific Energy (previously known as Pacific Oil & Gas) is an independent energy resources development company. In the upstream sector, Pacific Energy is focused on the exploration and production of gas in Canada. Its midstream and downstream operations include a liquefied natural gas (LNG) receiving terminal and a combined cycle gas turbine (CCGT) power plant in China. In addition, it is currently developing gas-fired power plants in China and an LNG export facility in Canada.

== Environmental issues ==
In 2014, Royal Golden Eagle was under considerable pressure from international environmental organisations to improve:

- World Business Council for Sustainable Development told APRIL that it would be expelled from the organisation if it did not end deforestation within 12 months, noting a government estimate that 60% of its pulp came from the rainforest. It also recommended that all Royal Golden Eagle companies should be included in the commitment, not just APRIL.
- The Worldwide Fund for Nature (WWF) gave a cautious response to APRIL's announced Sustainable Forest Management Policy, noting that the policies did not go far enough and that previous commitments had not been honoured. It recommends that external parties should 'wait and see' before sourcing or investing in APRIL or associated businesses.
- Greenpeace claimed that APRIL, along with its sister companies, "is the greatest threat to the Indonesian rainforest".

In June 2015, both Greenpeace and WWF welcomed the commitments made by RGE and APRIL to zero deforestation across their supply chains.

In December 2015, APRIL announced a US$100 million investment in conservation and eco-restoration of peatland in Riau, spanning 150,000 hectares.

The company and its business groups engage local communities and NGOs to develop programs for community development and fire prevention, to great success.

In 2011 the Rainforest Action Network named APRIL as one of Indonesia’s most destructive corporations cutting rainforests and replacing them with monoculture acacia pulp wood plantations grown on these cleared rainforests and peatlands. APRIL and another major company under separate ownership, Asia Pulp & Paper, produce 80 percent of Indonesia’s pulp and paper.

== Controversy ==
=== Tax evasion ===
Asian Agri was investigated for allegedly evading taxes between 2002 and 2005, which the company consistently denied. In December 2012, the Supreme Court of Indonesia ordered Asian Agri Group to pay Rp2.52 trillion (US$260 million) in back taxes and fines as vicarious liability, The company paid the back tax and in January 2014 paid the fine saying it would still file a judicial review. Indonesia’s Tempo magazine was found guilty by the Jakarta court of defaming the company in an investigative report looking into these matters, which were published in the book Key Witness.

=== Deutsche Bank controversy ===
Beckett Pte Ltd, 29% of which is indirectly owned by Sukanto Tanoto, was in legal disputes against Deutsche Bank, claiming that the bank had pledged shares, owned directly or indirectly by Beckett Pte Ltd in PT Swabara Mining and Energy, PT Asminco Bara Utama, PT Indonesia Bulk Terminal and PT Adaro Indonesia without due process and at an undervalue. Singapore's High Court found in favour of Deutsche Bank. The High Court did however state that Deutsche Bank had "failed to discharge its duties as pledgee" in a share sale.

== See also ==
- Deforestation in Indonesia
