= Vinda International =

Asian hygiene products company

Vinda International Holdings Limited 维达国际控股有限公司
- Type: Private
- Traded as: SEHK: 3331(until August 16, 2024)
- Industry: Hygiene products
- Founded: 1985
- Founder: Li Chaowang
- Headquarters: Vinda Official Website, Xinhui, Guangdong, People's Republic of China
- Area served: People's Republic of China Asia
- Key people: Chairman: Mr. Li Chaowang CEO: Mr. Christoph MICHALSKI
- Products: Tissue and Hygiene Products
- Number of employees: 11,465 (2023)
- Parent: SCA Hygiene (2007-2017); Essity (2017-2024); RGE Group (2024-present)
- Subsidiaries: Everbeauty Corp. (Taiwan)
- Website: Vinda International Holdings Limited

Vinda International Holdings Limited (Vinda) (simplified Chinese: 维达国际控股有限公司; traditional Chinese: 維達國際控股有限公司; pinyin: Wéidá Guójì Kònggǔ Yǒuxiàngōngsī, SEHK: 3331) is a major hygiene company in Asia, specializing in the manufacturing and sale of tissue paper and personal care products. Founded in 1985, the company has established a significant presence in multiple Asian markets, including Mainland China, Hong Kong, Malaysia, Singapore, South Korea, Thailand, Japan, U.S., UK, Canada, France, Germany, India, Italy, Mexico, the Netherlands, Poland, Slovakia, Sweden, and Taiwan.

Its tissue paper products with brand name "Vinda" has been recognized as a "China famous brand". Its headquarters is in the Donghou Industrial Development Zone (S: 东侯工业区, T: 東侯工業區, P: Dōnghóu Gōngyèqū) in Huicheng Town in Xinhui District, Jiangmen, Guangdong.

== History ==
=== Origins ===
Vinda International Holdings Limited was founded in 1985 as Xinhui Daily Necessities Factory through the merger of three small factories in Xinhui, Guangdong, China. The company initially did not focus on household paper products. However, under the leadership of Li Chao Wang, the factory director at the time, the company shifted its focus and began producing sanitary paper products, such as tissue and toilet paper with over half of the workforce composed of disabled individuals. By 1993, the company transitioned into a joint-stock company and began importing advanced machines from Japan and the United States to improve its production capabilities. The company gradually expanded its product line and focused on producing high-quality products, which contributed to its growth into one of China's leading household paper manufacturers.

In 1997, Vinda expanded its operations through the acquisition of two factories in Hubei and Shanghai. This expansion significantly increased the company's production capacity in various regions, including Hubei, Shanghai, Beijing, and Sichuan, and contributed to its dominance in the Chinese tissue and paper industry. In 1999, Vinda International Holdings Limited, Vinda's holding company, was incorporated in the Cayman Islands. By 2005, the company had achieved over 1.2 billion RMB in sales and had established a global presence with regional subsidiaries in China and abroad. That same year, the company moved its headquarters from Xinhui to Hong Kong to facilitate access to international financing.

In 2007, Vinda debuted on the Hong Kong Stock Exchange (HKEX), raising approximately HK$1 billion in its IPO. This allowed the company to access increased financial resources to support further investments in its production capacity and brand development. In 2009, Vinda entered into new banking agreements with Hang Seng Bank and Bank of China (Hong Kong), securing additional financial support for its growth. These agreements included term loans with conditions requiring the company's major shareholders, such as Li Chao Wang, to retain at least 25% of the company's shares. This financial restructuring played a crucial role in maintaining the company's operational stability and ensuring the availability of resources for future expansion.

=== International expansion ===
Although Vinda went public in 2007, its connection with Essity, a Swedish multinational hygiene and health company, started before the IPO. Through two shareholding increases in 2008 and 2012, SCA Group, Essity's parent company at the time, became the second-largest shareholder of Vinda International. By 2013, SCA acquired a controlling 51.59% stake in Vinda, making it a majority-owned subsidiary. This acquisition enhanced Vinda's product innovation capabilities and supported its international expansion.

Vinda made another major step in its expansion strategy by officially opening its Southeast Asia (SEA) Regional Hub in Selangor, Malaysia in 2022. The first phase of the hub, located on a 30-acre site, was launched on December 16, 2022. The facility was designed to increase the company's production capacity and efficiency in the region and included an Innovation Center, manufacturing, warehousing, and distribution facilities. The hub was intended to primarily serve the Malaysian market while also supporting other Asian markets such as Singapore, Indonesia, Thailand, Cambodia, Vietnam, and the Philippines. The Innovation Center, the second of its kind outside of China, focused on research and development, product safety, innovation, and material development. The expansion of the hub was part of Vinda's strategy to strengthen its supply chain in Southeast Asia. By the time the first phase was completed, the site employed 1,200 local workers.

=== Further developments ===
In 2024, Essity divested its entire holdings in Vinda. Vinda was acquired by Royal Golden Eagle (RGE), a Singapore-based conglomerate, in a transaction valued at approximately HK$26.1 billion through RGE's subsidiary Asia Pacific Resources International Holdings Limited (APRIL). The transaction provided Vinda with access to RGE's resources and expertise, strengthening its position within the Asia-Pacific region and enhancing its competitiveness on a global scale.
