= Walter Schieber =

Walter Schieber (13 September 1896 – 29 June 1960) was an SS Brigadeführer in Nazi Germany, who during the Second World War served as head of the Armaments Supply Office under Albert Speer. In 1943, Adolf Hitler awarded Schieber the War Merit Cross.

After the war, the US government became interested in hiring Schieber for scientific research purposes. A 1947 U.S. Air Force memo stated that "Dr. Schieber's talents are of so important a nature to the U.S. that they go far to override any consideration of his political background". In the end, Schieber's profile meant it was not possible to bring him to America, but he was employed by the US for ten years in chemical warfare research in West Germany. In 1948, a German denazification tribunal sentenced Schieber to two years in prison, as he'd been in internment since the war ended.
