= Asian Agri =

Company of Indonesia

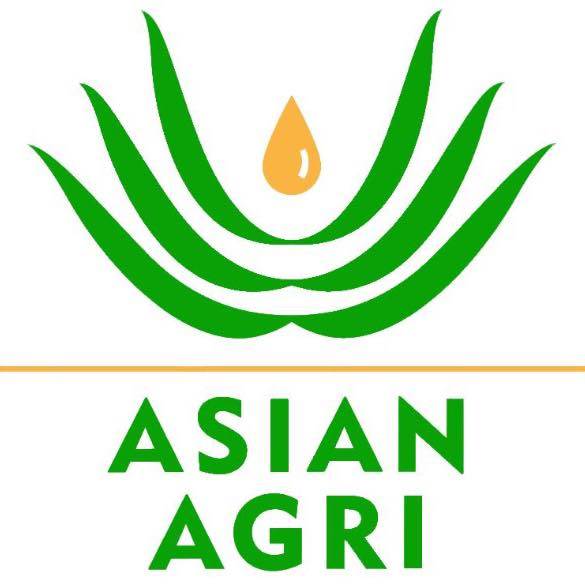
- Type: Private
- Industry: Palm Oil Plantation and Mill
- Headquarters: Jl. Letjend MT Haryono No.A-1 Medan, Indonesia
- Products: Crude Palm Oil (CPO), Crude Palm Kernel Oil (CPKO), Palm Kernel Expeller (PKE), Palm Kernel Shell
- Number of employees: More than 22,000
- Website: asianagri.com/en

Asian Agri is one of Asia's largest palm oil producers, with an annual production of 1 million tons of palm oil. Asian Agri is a member of the Royal Golden Eagle (RGE) group of companies.

== Business ==
Founded in 1979, Asian Agri manages 30 palm oil plantations, 23 mills and 12 kernel-crushing plants in Sumatra, Indonesia. It has a total oil palm plantation area of 100,000 hectares, and partners with Plasma smallholders responsible for an additional 60,000 and independent smallholders responsible for 41,000 hectares. It employs more than 22,000 employees.

== Partnerships ==
=== PIR-trans and plasma programs ===
Asian Agri was one of the first companies involved in Indonesia's PIR-Trans (Perkebunan Inti Rakyat-Transmigrasi) program in 1987. The program brought together plantation owners with transmigrated smallholders. Asian Agri developed and implemented the program in Riau and Jambi, Sumatra, facilitating plantation development, developing infrastructure and providing training in best agronomic practices. The company also assisted smallholders in securing bank loans. Smallholders now contribute to half of Asian Agri's total palm oil production.

The company has also assisted its partnered smallholders in receiving certification, such as RSPO, International Sustainability and Carbon Certification (ISCC), and Indonesian Sustainable Palm Oil (ISPO).

=== Independent smallholders ===
Asian Agri's partnership with smallholders extended to selected independent smallholders. Along with WWF Indonesia, RSPO and the government, the company helped established the Amanah Palm Oil Independent Smallholders Association in 2012. As of 2015, the Amanah Association comprised 349 smallholders managing 763 hectares of land. It is the first independent smallholders cooperative in the country to be RSPO-certified.

In March 2016, the Indonesia Agriculture Ministry, the United Nations Development Programme and Asian Agri piloted a 3-month training program for 500 members of the Amanah Association in effective plantation management. SNV Netherlands Development Organisation facilitated the training and technical support. Participants were later independently assessed based on the Indonesian Sustainable Palm Oil (ISPO) standards, before being the pioneer batch of independent smallholders to receive ISPO certification.

In 2022 Asian Agri announced its Asian Agri 2030 sustainability targets, including assisting 100% of partner smallholders to achieve ISPO certification, and helping 5,000 smallholders earn RSPO certification. As of 2024 72% of Asian Agri’s partner smallholders were ISPO certified, and 1,373 were RSPO certified.

== Sustainability ==
=== Certification ===
Asian Agri’s plantations are 100% certified by the Roundtable on Sustainable Palm Oil (RSPO), Indonesian Sustainable Palm Oil (ISPO), and International Sustainability & Carbon Certification (ISCC).

=== Fire prevention ===
Asian Agri implemented a zero burning policy across its operations in 1994 to prevent land by cleared by fire. It became a founding member of the Fire-Free Alliance in early 2016. The Alliance implements the Fire-Free Village Programme, which was pioneered by Asia Pacific Resources International Holdings. Implemented in collaboration with NGOs, government agencies and the police, the programme involves education, training, capacity-building, infrastructure development and incentivization for villages to adopt no-burn practices to land clearing.

In parallel with its implementation of the Fire-Free Village Programme, Asian Agri also engages communities through the Masyarakat Peduli Asap program, which similarly promotes fire prevention and best practices in fire management.

=== Palm oil-related pledges and commitments ===
At the 2014 United Nations Climate Summit, Asian Agri was a signatory of the New York Declaration on Forests, which commits to halving the rate of deforestation by 2020, and end it by 2030. In parallel, the company also became a signatory of the Indonesian Palm Oil Pledge (IPOP) along with Golden Agri Resources (GAR), Wilmar and Cargill, committing to deforestation-free palm oil cultivation practices in their supply chains. IPOP disbanded on July 1, 2016.

Asian Agri has had a commitment to zero deforestation since 2014.

In 2015, Asian Agri, along with Apical, partnered The Forest Trust to develop and improve its supply chain traceability.

In 2017 Asian Agri achieved 100% traceability of fresh fruit bunches reaching its mills

In 2018 Asian Agri became a founding member of The Sustainability Assurance and Innovation Alliance (SUSTAIN), a group of oil palm growers, palm oil processors, consumer goods manufacturers, not-for-profit organizations and technology companies who are using blockchain to improve palm oil traceability

=== Biogas power plants ===
In 2015, Asian Agri announced plans to build 20 biogas power plants by 2020. The power plants will be powered by biogas produced from palm oil mill effluent. The company had 11 biogas power plants as of April 2025, each of which can reduce GHG emissions from mill operations by 90%. Asian Agri also sells renewable energy from one of the plants to Indonesia’s grid.
