= Pangkalan Kerinci =

Town or district in Riau, Indonesia

Coordinates: 0°24′N 101°51′E

Pangkalan Kerinci (Jawi: ڤڠكالن كرينچي ) is a town and district in Pelalawan Regency, of Riau province of Indonesia. The town is the administrative capital of Pelalawan Regency., Pangkalan Kerinci is a district that also serves as the administrative and economic center of Pelalawan Regency, Riau Province, Indonesia. The district has strong development potential because it is located along the Trans-Sumatra Highway.Historically, the name of this district is closely connected to migrants from Kerinci Regency, Jambi Province. The people of the Kerinci ethnic group were the first to clear and settle this area more than a century ago, transforming what was once dense forest into a thriving settlement that has since grown into a modern region.

Kerinci migration route, Pelalawan became the main migration corridor for the Kerinci people heading to the Malay Peninsula. Since the 17th century, Kerinci migrants—once part of central Sumatra under the same province as Riau—moved in large numbers to Malaysia via Pelalawan and Pekanbaru. Many became prominent figures in Malacca, particularly in the Sultanates of Johor and Selangor. Their migration path naturally passed through Riau, including the Kingdoms of Siak and Pelalawan.

Colonial transition and settlement land,Following the 1824 London Treaty (the Bengkulu–Malacca exchange between the Dutch and the British), some Kerinci migrants were stranded in Riau. The Sultan of Pelalawan granted them temporary land about 30 km west of the Sayap Palace. This site later developed into Pangkalan Kerinci.

Diaspora to Malaysia and abandoned plantations, Before the Kerinci–West Sumatra–Riau–Malaysia route was secure, the migrants opened land and settled temporarily on plots granted by the Sultan of Pelalawan. Once the route became safe, they continued their journey to Malacca, Selangor, and Johor, leaving behind the plantations they had cultivated in Pangkalan Kerinci. The area remained vacant for years until later resettled and rapidly developed, especially after the establishment of a major paper mill in Pelalawan, which became the driving force of the local economy.

Kerinci cultural influence,Traditional houses in Riau show strong influence from the Kerinci “rumah gedang” style. Features such as tiered straight roofs and elongated communal spaces for clan deliberations inspired the design of Riau’s vernacular architecture.

Historical evidence, Traces of Kerinci migration through Riau can be found in relics and in the Kerinci Museum in Malaysia. The Kerinci people also maintained close ties with the last Sultan of Pelalawan before Indonesia’s independence.

In summary: Migrants from Kerinci Regency (Jambi) were the original settlers of Pangkalan Kerinci (Pelalawan, Riau), using it as a safe migration corridor supported by land grants from the Sultan of Pelalawan. Malaysia became the ultimate destination of the Kerinci diaspora. Pangkalan Kerinci itself only regained momentum after the paper mill was established, while Kerinci cultural influence continues to live on in Riau’s traditional houses. In more recent history, during the early 1990s, Pangkalan Kerinci began to be re-inhabited by a new generation due to the expansion of large companies, marking the start of modern development in the region.

In 1993, Pangkalan Kerinci was a small village in the Sumatran rain forest. During that year, four thousand workers commissioned by Sukanto Tanoto constructed a river port and a large logging mill there. At this time, the Pangkalan Kerinci Township was home to 200 households; the district population would grow to 114,697 individuals by mid 2025 as APRIL Group's business expanded and diversified, transforming Kerinci into a social and commercial regional hub.

Commercial pulp production commenced in 1995, followed by commercial paper production in 1998. From the beginning, the region's growth would mirror the growth of APRIL Group's operations in Indonesia, with the Pelalawan Regency established in 1999, followed by the establishment of the Pelalawan Kerinci District within the Pelalawan Regency in 2001. Kerinci's continued growth would see its urban area divided into three kelurahan (urban villages) in 2005; the district (which all shares the postcode 28381) also includes four rural desa, listed first in the table below, of which Mekar Jaya and Makmur are situated to the north of the urban area and Kuala Terusan and Rantau Baru situated to its south.

Kode Wilayah	Name of kelurahan or desa	Area in km^{2}	Pop'n Estimate mid 2025
14.05.02.2001	Mekar Jaya	19.21	4,033
14.05.02.2002	Kuala Terusan	44.30	598
14.05.02.2003	Makmur	5.24	7,792
14.05.02.2005	Rantau Baru	83.34	909
14.05.02.1007	Pangkalan Kerinci Barat	26.02	9,049
14.05.02.1008	Pangkalan Kerinci Kota	14.20	42,051
14.05.02.1009	Pangkalan Kerinci Timur	55.45	50,255
14.05.02	Totals	247.76	114,687

In 2010, APRIL Group's forestry operations was measured to contribute 6.9% of Riau Province's total economic output. APRIL Group has created approximately 90,000 employment opportunities, which when coupled with its initiative to deliver better access to education and social support in areas such as healthcare and housing, has seen improved living standards and a reduction in poverty levels of 30%.

== Climate ==
Pangkalan Kerinci has a tropical rainforest climate (Af) with heavy rainfall year-round.

Climate data for Pangkalan kerinci
Month	Jan	Feb	Mar	Apr	May	Jun	Jul	Aug	Sep	Oct	Nov	Dec	Year
Mean daily maximum °C (°F)	30.7 (87.3)	31.4 (88.5)	31.9 (89.4)	32.3 (90.1)	32.5 (90.5)	32.0 (89.6)	31.9 (89.4)	31.8 (89.2)	31.7 (89.1)	31.9 (89.4)	31.5 (88.7)	31.0 (87.8)	31.7 (89.1)
Daily mean °C (°F)	26.3 (79.3)	26.8 (80.2)	27.1 (80.8)	27.5 (81.5)	27.7 (81.9)	27.1 (80.8)	27.0 (80.6)	26.9 (80.4)	26.9 (80.4)	27.0 (80.6)	26.9 (80.4)	26.6 (79.9)	27.0 (80.6)
Mean daily minimum °C (°F)	22.0 (71.6)	22.2 (72.0)	22.4 (72.3)	22.8 (73.0)	22.9 (73.2)	22.3 (72.1)	22.1 (71.8)	22.0 (71.6)	22.2 (72.0)	22.2 (72.0)	22.3 (72.1)	22.2 (72.0)	22.3 (72.1)
Average rainfall mm (inches)	217 (8.5)	201 (7.9)	241 (9.5)	247 (9.7)	205 (8.1)	131 (5.2)	123 (4.8)	152 (6.0)	204 (8.0)	259 (10.2)	299 (11.8)	260 (10.2)	2,539 (99.9)
Source: Climate-Data.org
